= First Family Entertainment =

First Family Entertainment was an entertainment group specialising in pantomime and other family theatre entertainment, formed in January 2005 as a joint venture between the producers David Ian for Live Nation and Howard Panter for the Ambassador Theatre Group.

First Family Entertainment was taken over by Qdos Entertainment from the 2017/18 season.

== Productions ==
=== 2010/2011 Productions ===
12 Productions are now planned for the 2010/2011 season.

The planned production of Sleeping Beauty at the Sunderland Empire was cancelled. Replaced with the musical 'White Christmas, running from 19 November 2010 until 1 January 2011.

- Aylesbury Waterside - Cinderella (10-Dec-10 to 9-Jan-11)
- Theatre Royal, Brighton - Cinderella (17-Dec-10 to 9-Jan-11)
- Bristol Hippodrome - Dick Whittington (11-Dec-10 to 2-Jan-11) with Barbara Windsor, Eric Potts & Andy Ford
- Churchill Theatre, Bromley - Aladdin (3-Dec-10 to 9-Jan-11)
- King's Theatre, Glasgow - Snow White (3-Dec-10 to 9-Jan-11)
- Liverpool Empire Theatre - Aladdin (10-Dec-10 to 2-Jan-11) with Les Dennis
- Manchester Opera House - Snow White (3-Dec-10 to 2-Jan-11)
- Milton Keynes Theatre - Jack and the Beanstalk (10-Dec-10 to 16-Jan-11)
- Richmond Theatre - Sleeping Beauty (10-Dec-10 to 16-Jan-11)
- Regent Theatre, Stoke-on-Trent - Robinson Crusoe (9-Dec-10 to 9-Jan-11)
- New Wimbledon Theatre - Peter Pan (17-Dec-10 to 16-Jan-11)
- New Victoria Theatre, Woking - Snow White (11-Dec-10 to 16-Jan-11)

=== 2009/2010 Productions ===
12 Productions were staged for the 2009/2010 season.

- Theatre Royal, Brighton - Peter Pan (4-Dec-09 to 3-Jan-10)
- Bristol Hippodrome - Snow White (11-Dec-09 to 10-Jan-10)
- Churchill Theatre, Bromley - Sleeping Beauty (4-Dec-09 to 17-Jan-10)
- King's Theatre, Glasgow - Aladdin (04-Dec-09 to 17-Jan-10)
- Liverpool Empire Theatre - Peter Pan (10-Dec-09 to 3-Jan-10)
- Manchester Opera House - Aladdin (5-Dec-09 to 3-Jan-10)
- Milton Keynes Theatre - Cinderella (4-Dec-09 to 17-Jan-10)
- Richmond Theatre - Snow White (4-Dec-09 to 10-Jan-10)
- Regent Theatre, Stoke-on-Trent - Dick Whittington (10-Dec-09 to 10-Jan-10)
- Sunderland Empire - Peter Pan (12-Dec-09 to 10-Jan-10)
- New Wimbledon Theatre - Aladdin (4-Dec-09 to 17-Jan-10)
- New Victoria Theatre, Woking - Cinderella (4-Dec-09 to 10-Jan-10)

=== 2008/2009 Productions ===
12 Productions were produced for the 2008/2009 season with the addition of the Hippodrome, Bristol and the Empire, Liverpool to the list of venues.

- Theatre Royal, Brighton - The Wizard of Oz (5-Dec-08 to 4-Jan-09)
- Bristol Hippodrome - Cinderella (12-Dec-08 to 11-Jan-09)
- Churchill Theatre, Bromley - Cinderella (5-Dec-08 to 18-Jan-09)
- King's Theatre, Glasgow - Cinderella (28-Nov-08 to 11-Jan-09)
- Liverpool Empire Theatre - Cinderella (11-Dec-08 to 4-Jan-09)
- Manchester Opera House - Peter Pan (6-Dec-08 to 4-Jan-09)
- Milton Keynes Theatre - Peter Pan (5-Dec-08 to 18-Jan-09)
- Richmond Theatre - Peter Pan (5-Dec-08 to 11-Jan-09)
- Regent Theatre, Stoke-on-Trent - Snow White (11-Dec-08 to 11-Jan-09)
- Sunderland Empire - Aladdin (5-Dec-08 to 4-Jan-09)
- New Wimbledon Theatre - Cinderella (5-Dec-08 to 18-Jan-09)
- New Victoria Theatre, Woking - Aladdin (5-Dec-08 to 18-Jan-09)

=== 2007/2008 Productions ===
10 productions were staged for the 2007/2008 season with the addition of the Sunderland Empire, owned by Live Nation.

- Theatre Royal, Brighton - Cinderella (7-Dec-07 to 6-Jan-08)
- Churchill Theatre, Bromley - Peter Pan (30-Nov-07 to 13-Jan-08)
- Kings Theatre, Glasgow - Sleeping Beauty (30-Nov-07 to 12-Jan-08)
- Manchester Opera House - Cinderella (8-Dec-07 to 6-Jan-08)
- Milton Keynes Theatre - Aladdin (7-Dec-07 to 20-Jan-08)
- Richmond Theatre - Cinderella (7-Dec-07 to 20-Jan-08)
- Regent Theatre, Stoke-on-Trent - Cinderella (13-Dec-07 to 13-Jan-08)
- Sunderland Empire Theatre - Cinderella (8-Dec-07 to 6-Jan-08)
- New Wimbledon Theatre - Snow White and the Seven Dwarfs (7-Dec-07 to 20-Jan-08)
- New Victoria Theatre, Woking - Peter Pan (7-Dec-07 to 13-Jan-08)

=== 2006/2007 Productions ===
9 productions were staged for the 2006/2007 with the addition of the Manchester Opera House as a venue. Pantomimes at the Opera House have previously been produced by Effective Productions and more recently Qdos Entertainment.

- Theatre Royal, Brighton - Aladdin (14-Dec-06 to 14-Jan-07)
- Churchill Theatre, Bromley - Mother Goose (1-Dec-06 to 14-Jan-07)
- Kings Theatre, Glasgow - Aladdin (1-Dec-06 to 13-Jan-07)
- Manchester Opera House - Snow White and the Seven Dwarfs (9-Dec-06 to 7-Jan-07)
- Milton Keynes Theatre - Cinderella (7-Dec-06 to 21-Jan-07)
- Richmond Theatre - Jack and the Beanstalk (8-Dec-06 to 20-Jan-07)
- Regent Theatre, Stoke-on-Trent - Aladdin (21-Dec-06 to 14-Jan-07)
- New Wimbledon Theatre - Peter Pan (7-Dec-06 to 14-Jan-07)
- New Victoria Theatre, Woking - Cinderella (7-Dec-06 to 21-Jan-07)
