= Rosemary Squire =

Theatre producer

Dame Rosemary Squire DBE
- Squire in 2011
- Born: Rosemary Anne Squire; 27 May 1956 (age 69); Nottingham, England
- Occupations: Theatre owner and producer
- Spouse: Sir Howard Panter
- Children: 3

Dame Rosemary Anne Squire, DBE (born 27 May 1956) is a British commercial theatre owner and entrepreneur. She is the founder of the Ambassador Theatre Group (ATG) LTD, and co-founder of Trafalgar Entertainment.

== Early life and education ==
Squire was born in Nottingham, England, on 27 May 1956. From 1967 to 1974, Squire attended Nottingham Girls' High School. She then enrolled at Southampton University between 1975 and 1979, where she earned a BA degree in Spanish. She later worked at the University of Barcelona from 1977 to 1978 as an English language assistant. Squire then studied at Brown University from 1979 to 1980 on a postgraduate scholarship.

== Career ==
Squire arrived in Theatreland in 1980. She held various administrative roles at Wyndham's Theatres Ltd. In 1984, she was a manager of Maxbox Group plc, the second largest group of West End theatres. In 1988, she became the manager of the theatre production company Turnstyle Group Ltd, of which she then became executive director. In 1991, she co-produced the West End revival of the musical Carmen Jones.

Squire and her husband Howard Panter established the Ambassador Theatre Group in 1992, with the acquisitions of the Duke of York's Theatre, a management contract of the Ambassadors Theatre, and a cinema complex in Woking. In 1995, ATG acquired the Ambassadors Theatre, which was renamed New Ambassadors Theatre in 1999. Between 1996 and 1997, the group expanded further with contracts for the Milton Keynes Theatre and the Regent Theatre, as well as Victoria Hall. In 1997, Squire became executive director of the Ambassador Theatre Group.

=== 2000s ===
In 2000, ATG acquired Churchill Theatre, Richmond Theatre, Albery Theatre, Donmar Warehouse, Fortune Theatre, Phoenix Theatre, Piccadilly Theatre, Comedy Theatre, Trafalgar Studios, Wyndhams Theatre, Playhouse Theatre, and the Theatre Royal Brighton. Squire joined the board of management of the Society of London Theatres and the advisory panel of Arts Council Capital. The expansion of ATG continued with the acquisition of two Scottish venues (King's Theatre and Theatre Royal Glasgow) and the reopening and rebranding of the New Wimbledon Theatre in 2004. Squire was elected a Fellow of the Royal Society of Arts and joined the board of Donmar Warehouse Productions.

In June 2005, Squire became the first democratically elected president of the Society of London Theatre (the trade organisation of London's theatre owners and managers), and the second-only female president in the organisation's 100-year history. She campaigned to improve the West End theatre-going environment and to secure vital funding for capital improvements to protect the long-term future of London's historic theatres. Squire became a member of The Arts Council of England Lottery Advisory Panel from 2000 to 2005 and is a member of the Theatrical Management Association.

In 2009, Squire was appointed a National Member of the Arts Council England Board. She was Chair of Great Ormond Street Hospital's Theatres for Theatres Appeal and vice-chairman of Dance Umbrella. She is also a Trustee of The Hall of Cornwall.

In February 2009, ATG acquired the Aylesbury Waterside Theatre. In November 2009, ATG realigned its shareholding to bring in private equity group Exponent for a deal to secure the funding for the acquisition of Live Nation's UK Theatre portfolio. Following this, ATG became the largest theatre group in the UK. Panter remained a joint-owner and became joint Chief Executive and Creative Director. Greg Dyke became the Executive Chairman of the larger group.

=== 2010s ===
In 2010, ATG opened the Aylesbury Waterside Theatre. In the same year, London's Evening Standard named Squire and her husband as the most influential people in British theatre in their list of "London's 1000 most influential people 2010". In 2011, ATG launched their Manchester Gets it First (MGiF) initiative. In February 2013, Squire appeared at number 16 on the inaugural BBC Radio 4 Woman's Hour Power List, intended to serve as a snapshot of the 100 most powerful British women.

In 2014, Squire topped The Stage 100 list for the fifth consecutive year, equaling the run previously set by Andrew Lloyd Webber. From 2010 to 2016, Squire topped the list seven times.

In March 2015, Squire announced The SPACe (the Squire Performing Arts Centre) at Nottingham Girl's High School. Squire was Chair of the 'Raise the Curtain' Development Board, which was created to oversee the project. Squire officially opened The SPACe in April 2017.

In 2016, Squire stepped down from her roles at Ambassador Theatre Group to concentrate on new projects. She co-founded a new live entertainment business, Trafalgar Entertainment, and acquired the two-space West End theatre, Trafalgar Studios.

== Personal life ==
Squire married Alan Brodie in 1982, with whom she had two children. She divorced Brodie in 1994 and married Howard Panter the same year, with whom she had one child.

== Productions ==
Produced by Rosemary Squire unless otherwise noted:

- 9 to 5 (UK tour and London)
- A Day in the Death of Joe Egg, 2019 London
- A Midsummer Night's Dream, 2003 London
- Admissions, 2019 London and UK Tour
- After Mrs Rochester, 2003, London
- All New People (UK regions and London)
- Annie Get Your Gun, 2014 UK tour
- Apologia, 2018 London
- Being Shakespeare (London, UK tour, New York and Chicago)
- Blue/Orange (UK tour)
- Carmen Jones, 1991 London
- Company, 2006–07 Broadway
- Dandy Dick (UK tour)
- Dirty Rotten Scoundrels, 2014 London
- Education, Education, Education, 2019 London
- Elling, 2007 London, 2010 Broadway
- Equus, 2019 London
- Exit The King, 2009 Broadway
- Far Away, 2000–01 London
- Fat Pig, 2008 London
- Ghost The Musical, 2011 Manchester, 2011 London
- Goodnight Mister Tom (London)
- Guys and Dolls, 2005–07 London, 2006–07 UK Tour, 2008–09 Australia, 2009 Broadway
- Inala, 2015 (London and UK Tour)
- Joe Egg, 2001 London, 2003 Broadway, 2009 UK Tour
- Jersey Boys (London)
- Jersey Boys, 2017 UK Tour
- Killer Joe, 2018 London
- La Cage Aux Folles (national US tour)
- Legally Blonde, 2009 London
- Legally Blonde (London, national tour and Sydney)
- Love Me Tender, 2015 (UK Tour)
- Macbeth (London)
- Mary Stuart, 2018 London
- Matthew Bourne's Highland Fling, 2005 London, 2005 UK Tour
- Matthew Bourne's Nutcracker!, 2002–03 / 2007–08 London, 2003–08 UK Tour, 2004 Worldwide Tour
- Misty, 2018 London
- Maurice's Jubilee (UK tour)* Monkee Business (regional tour)
- Mouth To Mouth, 2001 London
- My One and Only, 2002 London
- Nine Night, 2019 London
- Noises Off, 2001 Broadway, 2001–03 London, 2008 UK Tour
- Oresteia, 2015 London
- Passion Play (London)
- Porgy and Bess, 2006–07 London
- Posh, Jumpy and Constellations (Royal Court at the Duke of York's, London)
- Pretending To Be Me, 2003 London
- Priscilla, Queen of the Desert (UK tour)
- Richard III, 2014 London
- Riflemind, 2008 London
- Rocky Horror Show, 2008 Australia, 2009–10 UK Tour
- The Rocky Horror Show 40th Anniversary (UK tour)
- The Rocky Horror Show, 2018 UK Tour / International Tour
- Shakespeare, The Man from Stratford, 2010 UK Tour
- Shockheaded Peter, 2001–02 London
- Smokey Joe's Café, 1996–98 London
- South Pacific (London and national tour)
- Spamalot (London and UK tour)
- Stephen Poliakoff's Sweet Panic, 2003–04 London
- Sunset Boulevard, 2008–09 London
- Sweeney Todd, 2004–05 London, 2006 UK Tour, 2005–06 Broadway
- The Grinning Man, 2018 London
- The Height of The Storm, 2018 London
- The Homecoming, 2015 London
- The Hothouse, 2013 London
- The King and I, 2018 London / UK and International Tour
- The Last Cigarette, 2009 London
- The Lover The Collection, 2008 London
- The Messiah, 2018 London and UK Tour
- The Misanthrope, 2009 London
- The Mountaintop, 2009 London
- The Mountaintop (Broadway)
- The Mystery of Charles Dickens, 2000–02 London, 2002 Broadway
- The Mystery of Charles Dickens 2012 (London)
- The New Statesman, 2006–07 London, 2006 UK Tour
- The Pride, 2014 London / UK tour
- The Ruling Class, 2015 London
- The Starry Messenger, 2019 London
- The Three Sisters, 2003 London
- Vincent In Brixton, 2002–03 London, 2003 UK Tour / Broadway
- Vulcan VII, 2018 UK Tour
- The Weir, 1997–98 London, 1999 Broadway
- West Side Story, 2008 London, 2008–09 UK Tour, 1995–97 Australia
- Women on the Verge of a Nervous Breakdown, 2014 London

== Honors and awards ==
- 2006 – CBI Real Business First Women Award for Tourism and Leisure
- 2008 – Appointed Officer of the Order of the British Empire (OBE) in the 2008 New Year Honours for services to Theatre
- 2008 – Entrepreneur of the Year – Regional Finalist
- 2012 – named one of the 250 of the most influential people in Greater Manchester at the Manchester Evening News Awards
- 2013 – Squire was listed first in the Evening Standard 'Power 1000' Theatre section.
- 2013 – assessed as the 16th most powerful woman in the United Kingdom by Woman's Hour on BBC Radio 4.
- 2014 – EY Entrepreneur of the Year.
- 2018 – Appointed Dame Commander of the Order of the British Empire (DBE) in the 2018 New Year Honours for services to Theatre and Philanthropy
