= Kate Saxon =

British theatre director

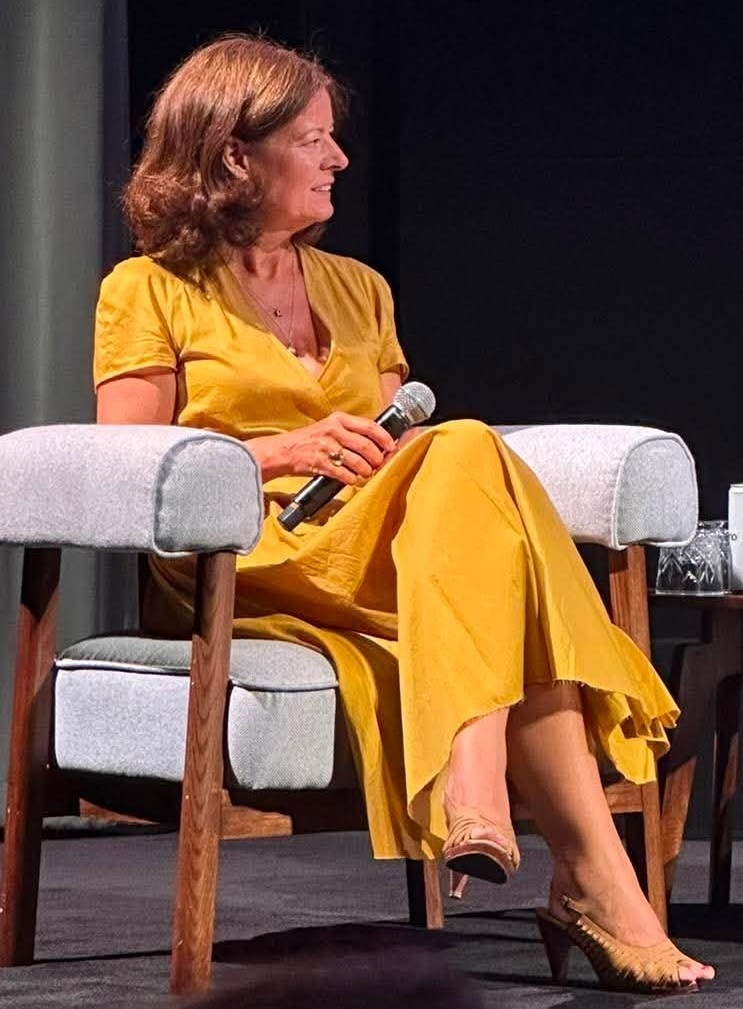
- Saxon at BAFTA Masterclass: The Art of Game Performance in Resident Evil Requiem in 2026

Kate Saxon is a British freelance TV, theatre and videogames cinematic and voice director who lives in London, England. Amongst her TV credits, Saxon directed three episodes of Endeavour, including the final episode which aired in 2023. She was Associate Director of Shared Experience theatre company from 2000 to 2012 and became an Associate Artist of the company. Saxon was the original Chair of Stage Directors UK. Video games that Saxon has been Performance and Voice Director of include Battlefield 2042, Mafia III, The Witcher 2: Assassins of Kings, The Witcher 3: Wild Hunt, Alien: Isolation, Fable II & Fable III, Still Wakes the Deep, Resident Evil Requiem.

== Early life and education ==
Saxon was brought up in Stratford-upon-Avon, England. When Saxon was 14, she auditioned for the Royal Shakespeare Company and was cast in two productions (Mary, After the Queen and The Dillen), which she performed in for two years in her evenings after school. She then went to a sixth form drama college, then to the University of Hull, graduating with a BA in English Literature and Drama. Afterwards, Saxon went to study acting at East 15 Acting School, then she carried on acting until her late 20s before she moved on to directing. Her first professional show was The Secret Garden at Salisbury Playhouse in 1999. Immediately after, Saxon left the Playhouse and began her assisting years in Opera, where she started to learn her craft as a director.

== Theatre ==
Saxon directed Phil Daniels in David Edgar's Jekyll and Hyde in 2018 and was director of the successful 2015 production of Alan Bennett's The History Boys for Sell A Door Theatre Company national UK tour. The Times gave 4 stars, stating: "Saxon definitely handles the shifts from the intimate and intellectual to the riotous." Saxon's productions include Tom Stoppard's The Real Thing which toured nationally in 2012 and The Years Between in 2011, for which her leading actress, Marianne Oldham, was nominated for Best Performer at the UK Theatre Awards. Saxon's productions also include the premiere of Mark Healy's 2008 adaptation of Thomas Hardy's Far From the Madding Crowd for English Touring Theatre, and John Fowles' The French Lieutenant's Woman, which premiered at the Fulton Opera House before a UK tour. For the Orange Tree Theatre's Susan Glaspell season Saxon staged the first revival of Glaspell's 1922 comedy Chains of Dew in March 2008. Saxon was Associate Director of the West End run and the international tour of Polly Teale's After Mrs. Rochester. It was first presented in 2003 in London by the Shared Experience theatre company and directed by the author.

Her international productions include Nine Parts of Desire at The Public Theater in New York City and later at The Wilma Theater in Philadelphia. The production was the winner of two Barrymore Awards.

== Game directing ==
Saxon is a cinematic performance capture and voice director. She was a performance director on Hangar 13's Mafia III, and performance and voice director on The Chinese Room's Everybody's Gone to the Rapture with Merle Dandridge, who earned a BAFTA Award for her voiceover performance. Saxon was a performance and voice director on Alien: Isolation, which was released by Creative Assembly to great acclaim, winning a BAFTA Award for Audio Achievement. Saxon was also a performance and voice director on CD Projekt's The Witcher 3: Wild Hunt, the most nominated game in the Game Awards 2015. She served as a performance and voice director for video games Far Cry 3, James Bond 007: Blood Stone and GoldenEye 007: Reloaded. As a cinematic and voice director on Castlevania: Lords of Shadow, she directed an all-star cast, including Patrick Stewart, Robert Carlyle and Jason Isaacs. Saxon also served as a cinematic and voice director on The Witcher 2: Assassins of Kings, which won over 50 awards globally including a number for best character and best voice acting. Prior to this, she served as a voice director for Funcom's popular MMORPG Age of Conan: Hyborian Adventures. For Ninja Theory's Heavenly Sword, Saxon directed all the lead level and AI dialogue and was a lead voice director on BAFTA winner Lionhead Studios' Fable II, which also won the Develop Award for Audio Accomplishment in 2009. For Fable III Saxon directed a cast of over 80 actors, including Ben Kingsley, Michael Fassbender, Simon Pegg, Naomie Harris and John Cleese. Saxon provided performance and voiceover direction for Killzone 2 and Killzone: Mercenary. She also directed Dragon Quest: Journey of the Cursed King, and for LucasArts' Star Wars: The Force Unleashed she cast European roles.

In 2024, Saxon was a casting and voice director on The Chinese Room's Still Wakes the Deep, winner of three BAFTA Games Awards with Alec Newman taking home the BAFTA for Performer in a Leading Role. In 2025, she served as a casting and voice director on Vampire: The Masquerade – Bloodlines 2, and a voice director on a story-driven sci-fi survival video game The Alters.

Saxon served as a casting, performance and voice director for Capcom's 2026 title Resident Evil: Requiem. Imaginarium Studios provided motion capture services for the game.

== Television ==
Saxon has directed two episodes of Silent Witness, two episodes of Grace, the latter of which aired in 2024, and three episodes of Endeavour including the finale. She has also directed two episodes of Call The Midwife series 8, which aired in 2019. Saxon has directed episodes of Casualty, EastEnders and Doctors series 17. In 2013, Saxon trained in multi-cam directing on the set of EastEnders and went on to direct several episodes, as well as the BBC Red Button episode "T & B 4 Eva". In 2017, Saxon was selected as one of only 15 UK female screen directors for BAFTA Elevate.
