= Qdos Entertainment =

UK-based entertainment company

- Company type: Limited
- Industry: Entertainment
- Founded: 1999
- Defunct: 2021
- Headquarters: Scarborough
- Key people: Nick Thomas MBE
- Website: qdosentertainment.co.uk

Qdos Entertainment was one of the largest entertainment groups in Europe.

== Pantomimes ==
Qdos Entertainment was the world's largest pantomime producer, having produced over 700 productions since it started.

In 2017, Qdos Entertainment confirmed it produce pantomimes for ATG venues (previously produced by First Family Entertainment) from the 2017–2018 season; at its peak it produced 35 pantomimes a year.

In 2020, due to COVID-19, Qdos Entertainment ran a reduced number of pantomimes, with the support of The National Lottery.

In 2021, Qdos' pantomime division was bought by Crossroads Pantomimes.

== Pubs, restaurants, rooms and cottages ==
The business owns and manages the award-winning Copper Horse Restaurant & Cottages at Seamer near Scarborough, The Mayfield Hotel in Seamer, The Plough Inn in Scalby in North Yorkshire and The Yew Tree Cafe also in Scalby plus other accommodation properties totaling over 50 bedrooms.

== Holiday and leisure entertainment ==
In April 2014, the TED Group, which was part of the Qdos Entertainment Group, was sold through a Management buy out.
