= Theatre Royal Sydney =

Theatre in Sydney, Australia

Theatre Royal
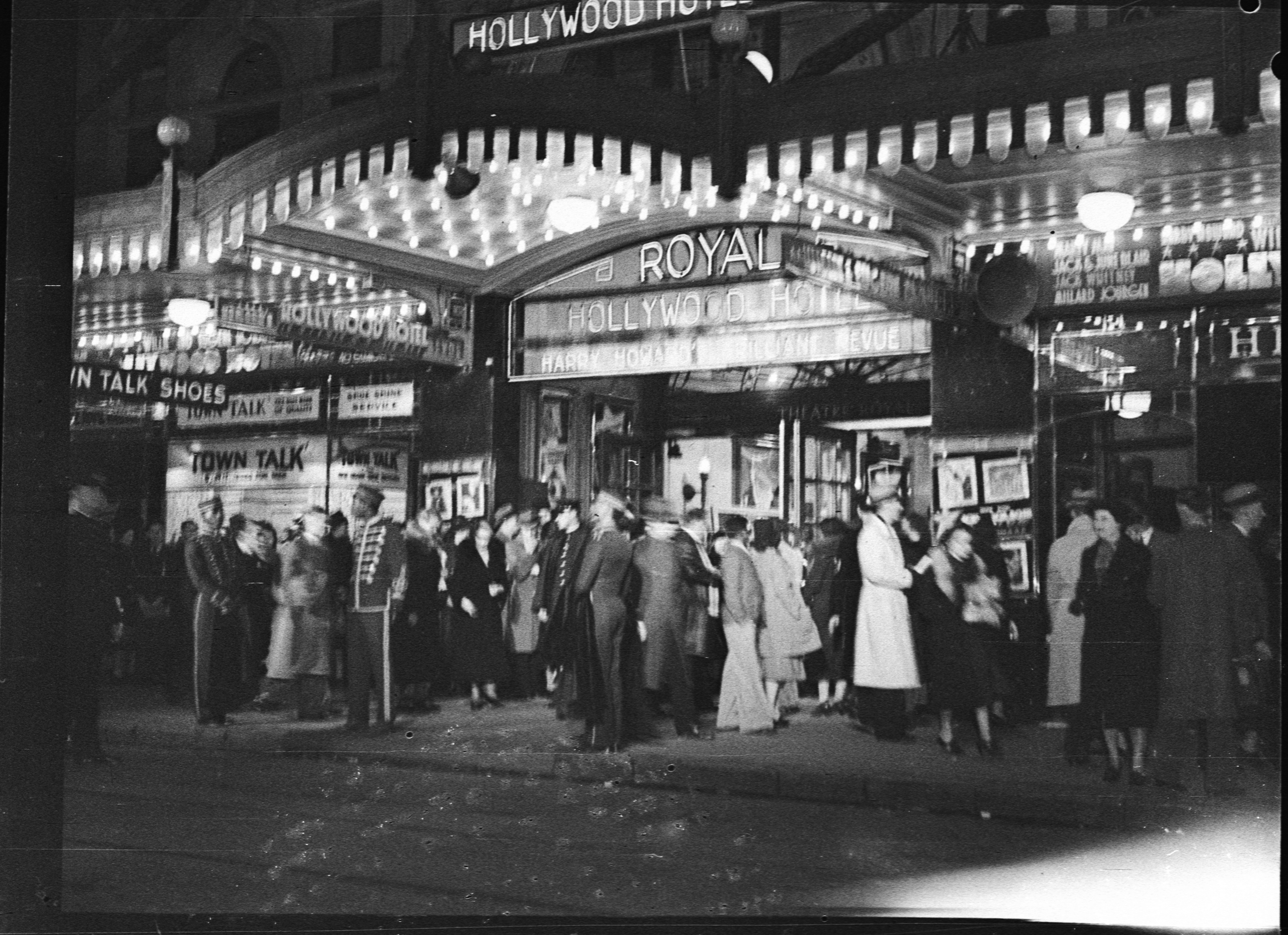
- Opening night, "Hollywood Hotel Revue", Theatre Royal, Sydney, 23 September 1938, by Sam Hood.
- Interactive map of Theatre Royal
- Address: 25 Martin Place; 108 King Street
- Location: New South Wales, Australia
- Coordinates: 33.868°S 151.2088°E
- Owner: Dexus, NSW Government
- Operator: Trafalgar Entertainment
- Capacity: 1,200
- Type: Performing Arts Venue

Construction
- Opened: 1875
- Renovated: 2021
- Demolished: 1971
- Rebuilt: 1976
- Years active: 1875—1971; 1976—2016; 2021—
- Architects: Barnett Levey (original building); Harry Seidler (1976 reopening)

Website
- www.theatreroyalsydney.com

Theatre Royal Sydney (TRS) is a theatre in Sydney, Australia. Earlier theatres also called the Theatre Royal, on the same site, date back to 1833. The current building, designed by modernist architect Harry Seidler, was built in 1976 and has offered a broad range of entertainment since the 1990s. After being closed in 2016, the theatre reopened in December 2021 under parent company Trafalgar Entertainment.

== Earlier theatres ==
=== First Theatre Royal ===
Construction by Barnett Levey of the first Theatre Royal commenced in 1827 and was opened on 5 October 1833. It closed in March 1838 and a few days later Joseph Wyatt's Royal Victoria Theatre, a much larger building, was opened, with an entrance on Pitt Street. Levey's Theatre Royal burned to the ground in 1840 with 'The Vic' (Royal Victoria), which abutted the rear, having a narrow escape. However, 'The Vic' was itself totally destroyed by fire on 22 July 1880.

=== Second Theatre Royal ===
The Prince of Wales Theatre was built in 1855 and destroyed by fire in 1860, rebuilt and burned down again in 1872. It was rebuilt by Samuel Lazar and, as the 'Theatre Royal', opened in 1875 between King and Rowe streets on Castlereagh Street, on the other side of which would in 1890 be built the famous Australia Hotel. The theatre was leased by J. C. Williamson's from 1882 to 1978. On 17 June 1892 the auditorium was largely destroyed by fire. This was the third theatre fire on the site.

It reopened on 7 January 1893 with a much improved electric lighting system. Its interior was substantially remodelled in 1921 by architect Henry Eli White.

== Current theatre ==
In 1971–72 the theatre, along with the Hotel Australia, and much of the block on which it was situated, was demolished to construct the MLC Centre. Public agitation and action by construction unions once it was closed to save it resulted in the developer Lendlease incorporating a replacement 1,180-seat theatre into the design.

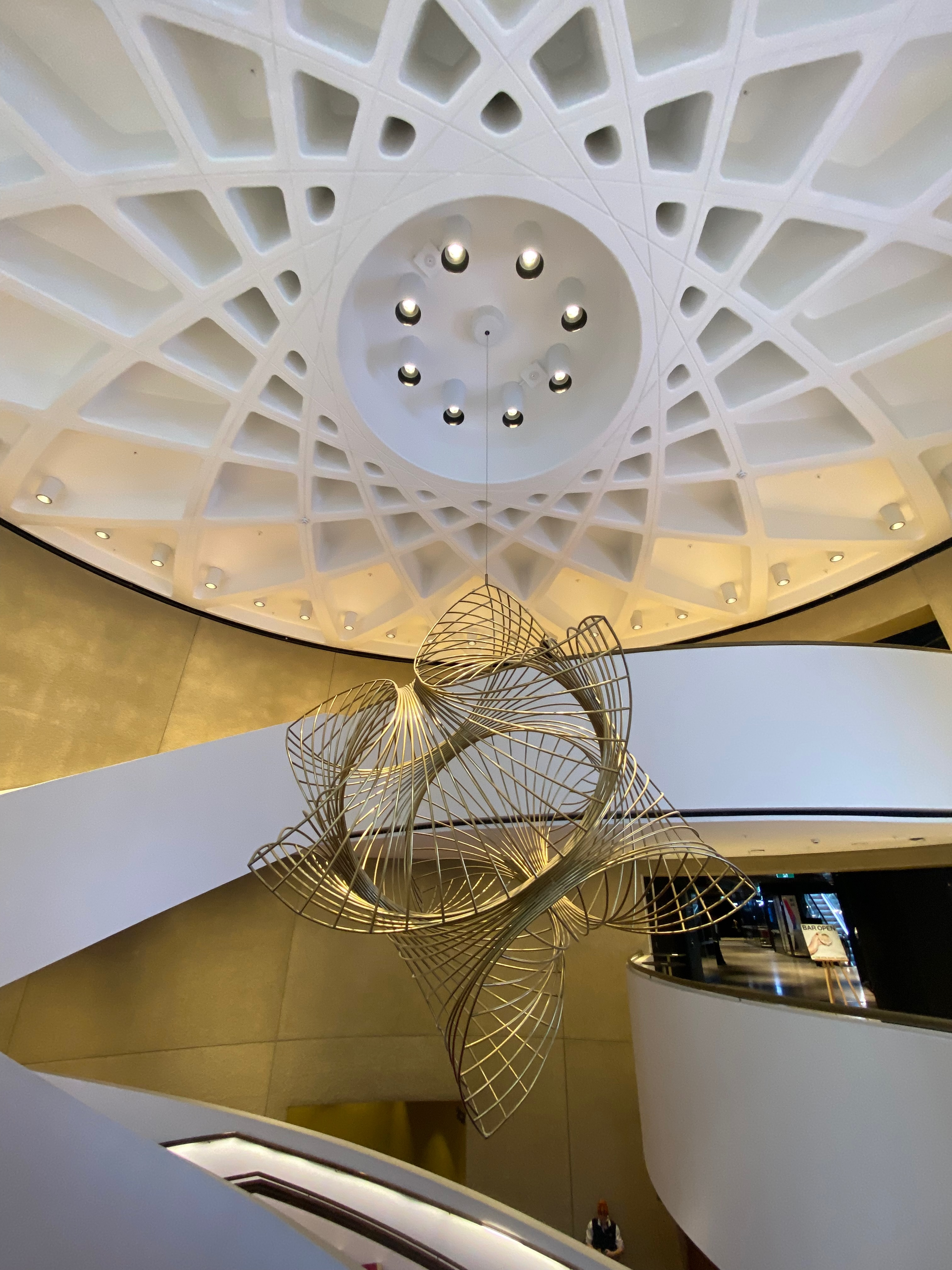
Foyer interior and stair, ceiling by engineer Pier Luigi Nervi and suspended artwork 'Mercator' 1975 by US sculptor Charles Perry

Designed by Harry Seidler in a plain modernist style, along with the rest of the complex, the current Theatre Royal opened in 1976, with entry from King Street, between Pitt Street and Castlereagh Street.

Theatre Royal Sydney (TRS) has hosted a mix of performances including notable productions such as The King and I, The Rocky Horror Picture Show, War Horse, Cats (1985—1987), Les Misérables (1987—1988), Phantom of the Opera (1993—1996) and Cloudstreet by Belvoir St Theatre in June and July, 2001.

The theatre closed in March 2016 amid refurbishment of the MLC Centre and calls for a new larger lyric theatre to be built.

In March 2019, the NSW Government announced it had taken on a 55-year lease of the theatre from the MLC Centre developers, with the intention to reopen the venue with a private operator. The theatre was acquired by Trafalgar Entertainment, the company of British theatre impresarios Sir Howard Panter and Dame Rosemary Squire, and reopened in 2021.

In November 2021, Theatre Royal Sydney opened with its first production, Jagged Little Pill the Musical.
