= Tim Phillips (musician) =

- Born: Terrace, British Columbia, Canada
- Origin: London, England
- Genres: Musicals; Songwriting; Film score
- Occupations: Composer, songwriter
- Website: www.wizardcreekproductions.com

Tim Phillips is co-creator of West End musical The Grinning Man. It opened at the Trafalgar Studios in December 2017.

He is a Canadian British composer, songwriter, and lyricist based in London, England.

== Career ==
He has written scores for many screen productions, including the BBC Film Roald Dahl's Esio Trot, HBO's Entourage, the Starz series Shining Vale and Becoming Elizabeth and the hit Channel 4 series Shameless, and Ackley Bridge. He collaborated with PJ Harvey on the music for British Academy Television Awards-winning Apple TV+ series Bad Sisters.

He is Co-Artistic Director of Filter Theatre, a national and international touring company he co-founded with actors Ferdy Roberts and Oliver Dimsdale in 2003. Their productions include Faster, Three Sisters, Water (all at the Lyric Hammersmith), a production of Bertolt Brecht's play The Caucasian Chalk Circle at the National Theatre, several RSC commissions (Silence and Twelfth Night), as well as A Midsummer Night's Dream. Filter has enjoyed widespread success with their productions.

Phillips provided the vocals for Murray Gold's "Song for Ten", an original song composed for the Doctor Who 2005 Christmas special, "The Christmas Invasion". He is set to provide the music for Quentin Tarantino's stage play The Popinjay Cavalier (2027).
