= The Popinjay Cavalier =

2027 play by Quentin Tarantino

- Promotional poster
- Original language: English
- Written by: Quentin Tarantino
- Music by: Tim Phillips
- Characters: Rupert Sebastian Thomas Jr.; General Rudolfo Gurko; Dexter; Robespierre du Maurier; Grand Duchess Zona of Lichtenburg
- Genre: Swashbuckler; Farce
- Setting: France; England

Premiere
- Place: Phoenix Theatre
- Directed by: Quentin Tarantino
- Official website

The Popinjay Cavalier is an upcoming stage farce written by Quentin Tarantino. Directed by Tarantino, the production is set to have its preview on 23 February 2027, before officially opening on 18 March at the Phoenix Theatre in London's West End. Sacha Baron Cohen is cast as Rupert Sebastian Thomas Jr., the lead character.

== Premise ==
Set in 1830s Europe, the play is "a rambunctious comedy of deception and disguise inspired by the swashbuckling epics of stage and screen." When world's greatest actor Rupert Sebastian Thomas Jr. causes a scandal en route to the Comédie-Française, by insulting the French people, he flees to England, only to fall into a more dangerous situation.

== Background ==
Quentin Tarantino, who had previously appeared on Broadway as an actor in a 1998 production of Wait Until Dark at the Brooks Atkinson Theatre, held a staged reading in 2014 in Los Angeles of an early draft of The Hateful Eight (2015) before the film's premiere. He has subsequently said that he wrote a stage adaptation of Once Upon a Time in Hollywood (2019) and has mentioned plans to adapt some of his other films for the stage.

== Production history ==
In August 2024, Tarantino announced he was developing a stage play. In January 2025, he began writing the play that he plans to also direct. In August 2025, he announced he had finished writing it and was moving to London to "start the ball rolling on it in January".

In March 2026, producers Sonia Friedman Productions and Sony Pictures Entertainment announced that the play, titled The Popinjay Cavalier, was in development and that they planned an early 2027 premiere in a West End theatre. It has been described as a "swashbuckling comedy" set in 1830s Europe and a farce. In July 2026, the show's developer Sonia Friedman praised Tarantino's script, before voicing her concerns for the rising production costs of recent London stage shows, including The Popinjay Cavalier.

By September 2026, Sacha Baron Cohen was cast as Rupert Sebastian Thomas Jr., in the lead role. Baron Cohen was previously set to appear in Tarantino's Django Unchained (2012), before he exited due to scheduling conflicts. By November 2026, Harry Hadden-Paton, Mark Hadfield, Nigel Lindsay and Kat Ronney were cast as General Rudolfo Gurko, Dexter, Robespierre du Maurier and Grand Duchess Zona of Lichtenburg, respectively. Bryony Corrigan, Anna Phoebe, George Blagden, Isis Cass-Clunie, Gavin Dunn, Ellis Elijah, James Gill, Chris Gordon, James Grimstone, Florence Guy, Shane Hampden, Tom Kelsey, Stephen Louis, Eoin McKenna, Sam Newton, Emily Odunsi, Jaden Oshenye, Sebastian Parker, Claire Price, Alfie Sherwood, Seb Slade, Hadley Smith, Jason Thorpe, John Vernon, Kai Virgo and Amber Weston filled out the cast. Tim Phillips wrote the music for the play. The play is set to have its preview on 23 February 2027, before officially opening on 18 March at West End's Phoenix Theatre. The show is set to close on 12 September 2027. It was previously set to close on 13 June 2027.

In October 2026, Tarantino revealed that he initially wrote The Popinjay Cavalier as a feature film screenplay for his tenth and final film, before he redeveloped it for the stage. In August 2025, Tarantino previously stated that if the play was well-received, he could adapt it into his tenth and final film.

== Cast and characters ==
Character	West End
Character	2027
Rupert Sebastian Thomas Jr.	Sacha Baron Cohen
General Rudolfo Gurko	Harry Hadden-Paton
Dexter	Mark Hadfield
Robespierre du Maurier	Nigel Lindsay
Grand Duchess Zona of Lichtenburg	Kat Ronney
