= Aylesbury Waterside Theatre =

Theatre in Aylesbury, England

Coordinates: 51°49′0.48″N 0°48′44.64″W

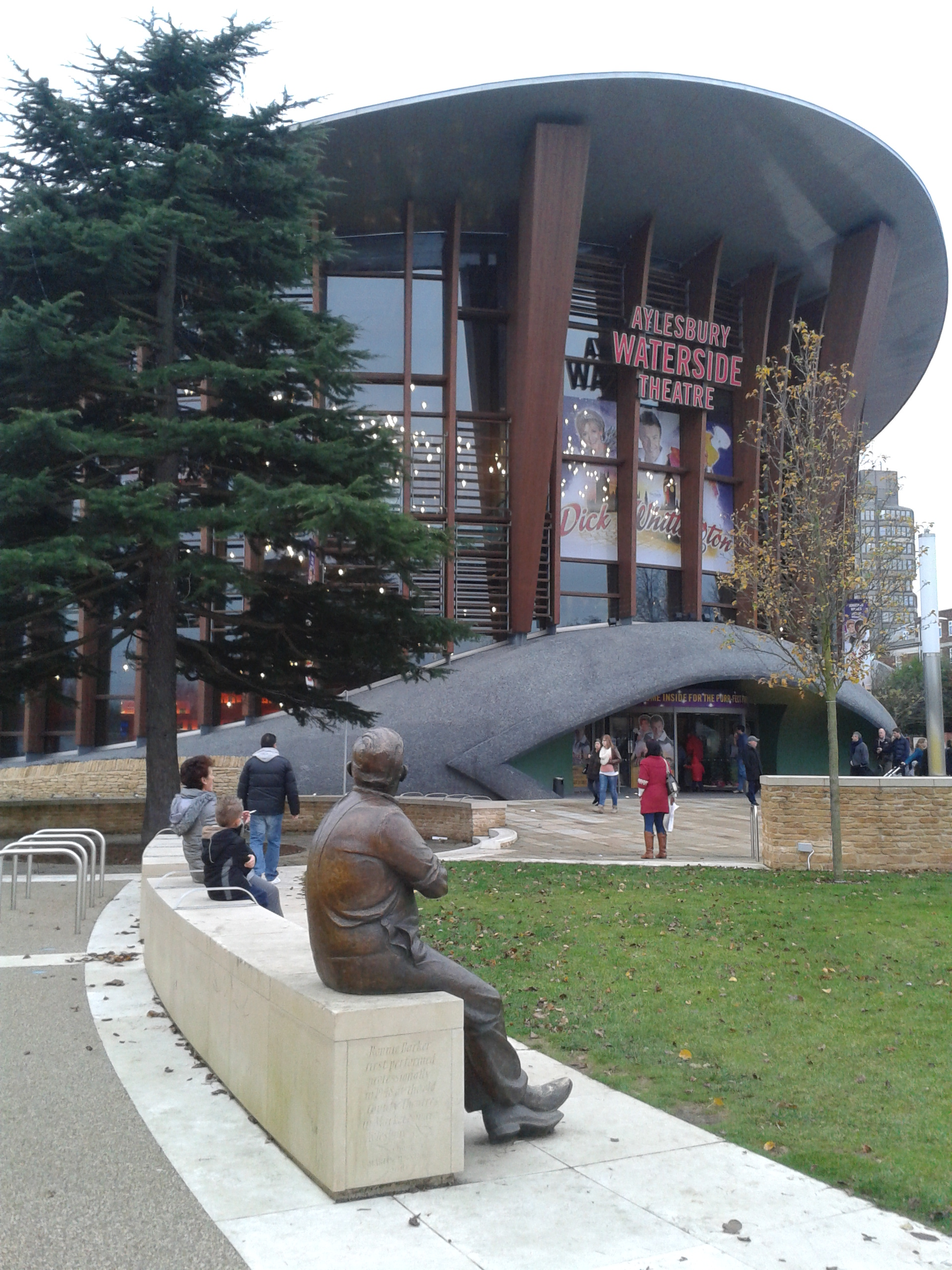
- Entrance to the Aylesbury Waterside Theatre, with the statue of Ronnie Barker in the foreground
- Interactive map of Aylesbury Waterside Theatre
- Address: Exchange Street; Aylesbury; United Kingdom
- Capacity: 1,200 (3 levels)
- Type: Proscenium

Construction
- Opened: 2010
- Cost: £47 million
- Architect: Norman Bragg for Aedas RHWL Arts Team

Website
- Official Box Office

Aylesbury Waterside Theatre is a theatre in Aylesbury, England, presenting a range of West End and touring musicals and plays, along with performances of opera and ballet and a Christmas pantomime.

== History ==
In 2003, Aylesbury Vale District Council held a public consultation into plans for a new theatre to be built to replace the current Civic Centre Theatre. Norman Bragg for London based architects AedasRHWL Arts Team was commissioned in 2007 to undertake detailed design work with a ceremony to mark the commencement of building work held on 24 May of that year with Councillor Sue Polhill, Chairman of Aylesbury Vale District Council cutting a sod from the earth. The building work was carried out by Hertfordshire-based Willmott Dixon.

On 18 February 2009 Ambassador Theatre Group was announced as the preferred management contractor for the new venue with Joint Chief Executives Howard Panter and Rosemary Squire, OBE signing a 6-year management contract in January 2010.

Aylesbury-raised actress Lynda Bellingham marked the completion of the highest part of the building work on 24 April 2009 with a traditional topping out ceremony.

In a joint press release on 23 February 2010, Ambassador Theatre Group and Aylesbury Vale District Council announced that the theatre would open on 12 October 2010. The first season went on sale on 23 March 2010 with Northern Ballet's Swan Lake set to be the first performance.

== Acoustics ==
The acoustic design, by Arup Acoustics, includes a CARMEN electroacoustic enhancement system. This electronically adjusts the base acoustic (designed for speech and amplified events) to provide a more reverberant sound for symphonic and choral performances.

== Grand opening ==
Aylesbury Waterside Theatre was officially opened on 12 October 2010 by Cilla Black. The launch was marked with an open air live event hosted by Jonathan Wilkes and Suzanne Shaw. Guests included David Suchet, Simon Callow, Ruby Wax, Susan Hampshire and Richard O'Brien. Monty Python star and Spamalot writer Eric Idle sent a pre-recorded message to mark the occasion.

== Funding and Costs ==
At the time the theatre was given planning permission in 2006, it was expected to cost £25 million. When the contractor Willmott Dixon was appointed in 2008, the cost had risen to £35 million. By the time the theatre opened in 2010 the final cost had risen again, to £47 million. Aylesbury Vale District Council (AVDC) appointed Ambassador Theatre Group (ATG) to manage the theatre. AVDC paid more than £192,000 in management fees to ATG from November 2010 to May 2011 and £350,000 in the first 12 months of operation. AVDC will also pay out £1.75 million towards running the Theatre over a five-year period.

In 2010 AVDC paid the Ambassador Theatre Group £19,500 to hire Aylesbury's Waterside Theatre, which the council owns and pays its business rates, for the 2010 general election count. Criticism of AVDC over the theatre in the local press led to AVDC councillors being banned from speaking to the local newspaper, the Bucks Herald, because of the way in which stories were being covered.

In April 2012, ATG reported a profits rise of 164 per cent. The ATG made £2.3 million in 2009 which rose to £16.3 million in 2011, through the 39 venues it now operates. This led to calls from some local politicians for the subsidy from AVDC of £600,000 pa. to be reduced when the contract is renegotiated in 2014.
