= After Mrs Rochester =

After Mrs Rochester is a 2003 novel and stage play by Polly Teale.

The play is based on the troubled life of novelist Jean Rhys and her 1966 novel Wide Sargasso Sea. It was first presented in 2003 in London by the Shared Experience theatre company. It was directed by the author. Cast members included Howard Panter, Madeleine Potter and Rosemary Squire.

It earned an Evening Standard Theatre Award for Best Director.

== Secondary literature ==
The play is the topic of a 2015 master's thesis titled "She gave him the eye, he gave her mon-ey" which offers a Lacanian reading of the text.
