= Smart Financial Centre =

American concert hall in Texas

Coordinates: 29°34′38″N 95°38′36″W

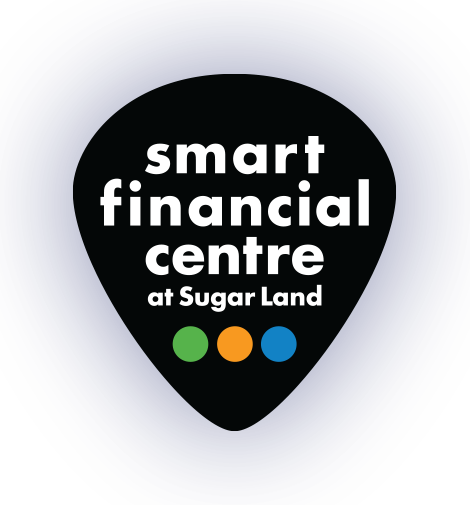

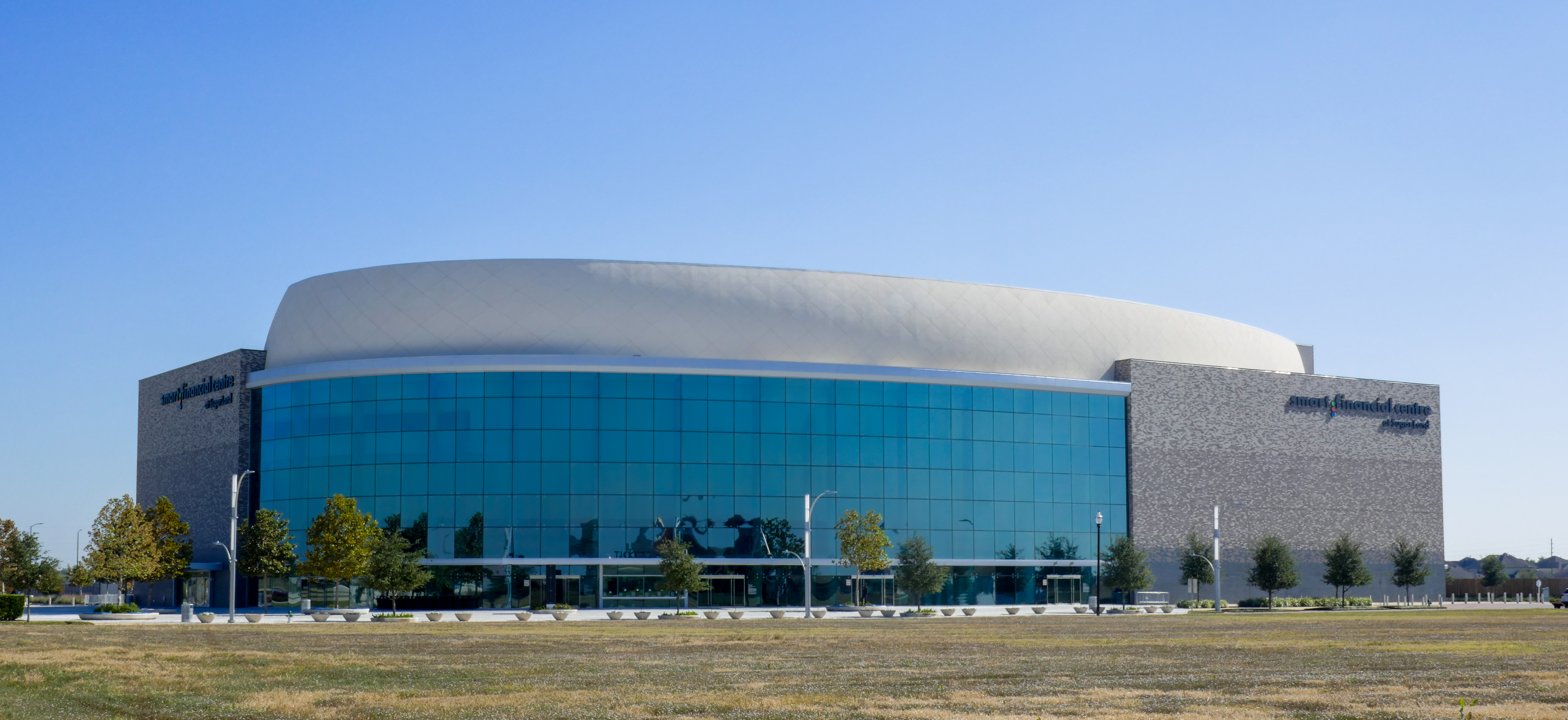
- Exterior of the venue in 2019
- Interactive map of Smart Financial Centre
- Address: 18111 Lexington Blvd; Sugar Land, TX 77479-3889
- Location: Sugar Land, Texas, Greater Houston
- Owner: City of Sugar Land
- Operator: ATG Entertainment
- Capacity: 6,400

Construction
- Groundbreaking: December 9, 2014
- Opened: January 14, 2017
- Cost: $84 million

Website
- us.atgtickets.com/venues/smart-financial-centre/

The Smart Financial Centre is a comedy, music and events venue located directly off U.S. Highway 59 in Sugar Land, Texas, 20 miles (32 km) southwest of Houston. It is owned by the city government of Sugar Land and operated by ATG Entertainment. It is the only indoor live performance venue of its kind in the Greater Houston area.

== History ==
Groundbreaking took place on December 9, 2014. In February 2015, naming rights were granted to Smart Financial Credit Union by the Sugar Land City Council. The venue opened on January 14, 2017 with back to back Jerry Seinfeld shows.

== Events ==
The theater is designed to host a wide range of performances.
