= Shared Experience =

British theatre company

Shared Experience is a British theatre company. Its current joint artistic directors are Nancy Meckler and Polly Teale. Kate Saxon is an Associate Director.

== Productions ==
- A Passage to India (2003)
- Madame Bovary
- After Mrs Rochester, by Polly Teale, on the life of Jean Rhys (2003)
- The Clearing
- The Magic Toyshop
- The Mill on the Floss
- A Doll's House
- Anna Karenina
- Gone to Earth
- A Passage to India
- Jane Eyre (2006)
- Brontë (2005/11)
- Orestes
- Kindertransport (2007)
- War and Peace adapted by Helen Edmundson (2008)
- Mine (2008)
- The Caucasian Chalk Circle (2009)
- The Glass Menagerie (2010)
- Speechless (2011)
- Mary Shelley (2012)
- Bracken Moor (2013)
- As You Like It (2017)
