= Nick Thomas (theatre producer) =

British theatre producer

- Born: 16 December 1959 (age 66); Blandford Forum, Dorset, England
- Occupation: Theatre producer

Nicholas Jeffrey Thomas MBE (born 16 December 1959) is a British entertainment entrepreneur and an Olivier-award-winning theatre producer. He is the founder, Chairman and joint-owner with his wife Sandra, of Qdos Entertainment Ltd (Qdos), whose subsidiaries include Five Star Collection Ltd, Adverset Media Solutions and Q Talent Ltd. In March 2021, Nick & Sandra sold HQ Theatres & Hospitality Ltd to Trafalgar Entertainment Group led by Sir Howard Panter and Dame Rosemary Squire, partnered with Barings, the global investment pension fund manager. In April 2021 Nick & Sandra Thomas sold Qdos Entertainment (Pantomimes) Ltd to Crossroads Live Holdings UK Ltd Live entertainment acquisition vehicle partnered in the US by Raven Capital Management LLC, and chaired in the UK by David Ian.

Since its inception, The Stage newspaper annual 'Stage 100' has accredited Thomas as one of the top 100 most influential people in British Theatre. In 2018, he was ranked 13th in the list, and his highest position was 5th in 2008.

In 2017, Thomas was the Executive Producer, alongside Qdos Entertainment Managing Director Michael Harrison, for Qdos' production of Dick Whittington at The London Palladium. The show was nominated for, and won, the Olivier Award for Best Entertainment & Family at the 2018 Olivier Awards.

Thomas was first listed in Who's Who in 2013. He is a Vice President of The Royal Variety Charity which organises The Royal Variety Performance.

== Performing career, 1970s–1980s ==
Thomas created the puppet act 'Tommer Puppets' in 1973. In 1975, aged 15, his act won Episode 22, Series 3 of the ATV Network series New Faces. The show was broadcast on 15 February 1975, and the Winners Show on 8 March, which was won by the late Al Dean, a Liverpool comedian. The Chuckle Brothers (working then as Paul & Barry Harman), and Lenny Henry were also on the Winner's Show. This marked the start of Thomas' professional career; he left school in 1975 and subsequently appeared in shows with Dick Emery, Mike & Bernie Winters, Ronnie Dukes & Ricky Lee, The Nolans, Cilla Black, Lena Zavaroni and Larry Grayson. His act also appeared on many cruise liners in Rey Grey Revues, including Lauro Lines 'Angelina Lauro' Chandris Lines 'Amerikanis', 'Britannis', and Costa Lines 'Eugenio C'.

== Producing career ==
=== Pantomimes ===
Thomas began producing pantomimes at The Charter Theatre Preston in 1982. In 1999 he bought E&B Productions (Theatre) Ltd, a rival pantomimes producer. In 2003 he bought Midas Productions Ltd a second rival producer. Qdos Entertainment (Pantomimes) Ltd is now the world's largest producer of pantomimes.

In the 2017-2018 season the company produced 35 pantomimes at theatres across Britain, including His Majesty's Theatre, Aberdeen, and the Grand Opera House in Belfast.

In April 2021, Nick & Sandra Thomas sold Qdos Pantomimes Ltd to Crossroads Live Holdings UK Ltd Live entertainment acquisition vehicle partnered in the US by Raven Capital Management LLC, and chaired in the UK by David Ian.

=== Pantomime at the London Palladium ===
In 2016 Thomas was Executive Producer for the Qdos production of Cinderella – the first pantomime to be produced at the London Palladium for almost 30 years. The show received two Olivier-award nominations in the Best Entertainment & Family and Best Costume Design categories at the 2017 Olivier Awards.

In 2017 Thomas was Executive Producer for the Qdos Production of Dick Whittington at the London Palladium. The show won the Olivier Award for Best Entertainment and Family at the 2018 Olivier Awards at an awards ceremony at The Royal Albert Hall on 8 April 2018.

In 2018 Snow White starred Dawn French, Julian Clary, Paul Zerdin, Nigel Havers, Gary Wilmot, Vincent Simone & Flavia Cacace.

In 2019 Goldilocks and the Three Bears starred Paul O'Grady, Julian Clary, Paul Zerdin, Nigel Havers, Gary Wilmot and Janine Duvitski.

In 2020 Pantoland at the Palladium starred Julian Clary, Ashley Banjo & Diversity, Paul Zerdin, Nigel Havers, Gary Wilmot, Charlie Stemp, Jac Yarrow & Beverley Knight.

=== Co-producing career ===
- The Wizard Of Oz - London Palladium 2023
- Crazy for You - Gillian Lynne Theatre London 2023
- The Little Big Things - @sohoplace London 2023
- Joseph and his Amazing Technicolour Dreamcoat - London Palladium 2019
- Mrs Henderson Presents - Noel Coward Theatre London 2016
- Doctor Doolittle - 2019 UK Tour
- The Addams Family - 2017 UK Tour
- Chitty Chitty Bang Bang - 2016 UK Tour
- Oklahoma! - 2015 UK Tour
- Fiddler on the Roof - 2014 UK Tour
- High Society - 2013 UK Tour
- The Bodyguard - Adelphi Theatre London 2012
- Jolson - Victoria Palace Theatre London 1995
- Buddy - Shubert Theatre New York 1990
- Buddy - Strand Theatre London 1989

=== Cruise Line Productions ===
Thomas' Qdos Entertainment (Productions) Ltd has produced extensively on Cruise Ships, for a number of different operators. These include:

- 2008 - 2014; Celebrity Cruises; 'Millennium', 'Constellation', 'Infinity', 'Summit'
- 2013 - 2018; Cunard Lines; 'Queen Victoria', 'Queen Mary 2', Queen Elizabeth.
- 2015 - 2018; P&O Cruises: Britannia

== Regional theatre operations career ==
In 2005, Thomas formed HQ Theatres Ltd (HQT) a joint venture between Qdos and Hetherington Seelig Theatres, which at the time operated the Wyvern Theatre, Swindon and The Swan Theatre, High Wycombe. Qdos went on to buy out Hetherington Seelig's shareholding in 2007. After a period of significant growth, the group is now the second largest regional theatre operator in the UK with a total of 12 venues under its management. [16].

== Talent agency career ==
- 1991: Creates the talent agency Artist Management Group Ltd.
- 2002: Creates Qvoice Ltd voice-over agency.
- 2003: Buys International Artistes Ltd with Artist Management Group.
- 2006: Buys JLM Artists Ltd.
- 2007: Buys holiday park agency The Entertainment Department (UK) Ltd, renames it TED Group.
- 2011: Merges International Artistes and JLM to create QTalent Ltd.
- 2014: JLM separates from QTalent to become Sharon Henry Management. QTalent continues to operate.

== Restaurants and hotel career ==
Thomas also operates a portfolio of restaurants, pubs and accommodation. These include:

- 1999 – 2008: Tricolos Scarborough.
- 2005 – Present: The Copper Horse, Seamer, Scarborough.
- 2010 – 2014: The Tanglewood, York.
- 2010 – 2013: The Restaurant @SJT Theatre, Scarborough.
- 2011 – Present: The Copper Horse Cottages & Rooms, Seamer, Scarborough
- 2013 – Present: The Mayfield Carvery/Restaurant/Rooms, Seamer, Scarborough
- 2013 – Present: The Plough Pub/Restaurant/Rooms, Scalby, Scarborough
- 2015 – Present: The Yew Tree Cafe, Scalby, Scarborough.
- 2021 – Rebranded to Five Star Collection.

== Charitable work and organisational affiliations ==
He is a fundraiser for Great Ormond Street Hospital and through his businesses has raised in excess of £1.2m for the Great Ormond Street Children's Hospital Charity. In 2017, Qdos Entertainment was included in the Friends of Adeona, a list recognizing those fundraisers whose activities have had the greatest impact on the hospital's work, which is the highest form of recognition that Great Ormond Street Hospital can bestow upon its supporters.

Thomas is a member of The Ivy Club, the Arts Club, Groucho Club and Soho House.

== Personal life ==
Thomas was born in Blandford Forum Dorset, the son of a garage proprietor Douglas William Thomas, and the youngest of five children.

In 1966 his family moved to Formby in Merseyside and, in 1967, to Scarborough, North Yorkshire. His first visit to a theatre was in 1967 to see 'The Bachelors Show' at The Futurist Theatre Scarborough. In 1970 he met Ken Dodd at The Futurist Theatre (after a show in which his wife-to-be was a Diddyman) and began a lifelong friendship with the entertainer. Dodd's early influence is credited by Thomas as his inspiration to start a career in show business. Thomas penned a tribute to Dodd in The Stage newspaper when the entertainer died in 2018.

Thomas attended Gladstone Road Junior School 1967-1971 and Scarborough High School for Boys (renamed Graham School) 1971-1975.

Thomas was married to Sandra Jane Thomas in 1985. They had their first child Verity in 1987 and their second child Christie in 1991. The couple have two grandchildren, Rupert, born 2014, Cecilia, born 2017, Avery, born 2021 and Violet, born 2022. The family have homes in Scarborough, London, Cornwall and Estepona Spain.

Thomas was appointed Member of the Order of the British Empire (MBE) in the 2019 Birthday Honours for services to the entertainment industry and charity.
