= Trafalgar Theatre =

West End theatre in London

Coordinates: 51.5066°N 0.1275°W

- Whitehall Theatre (prior to 2004), Trafalgar Studios (2004-2020)
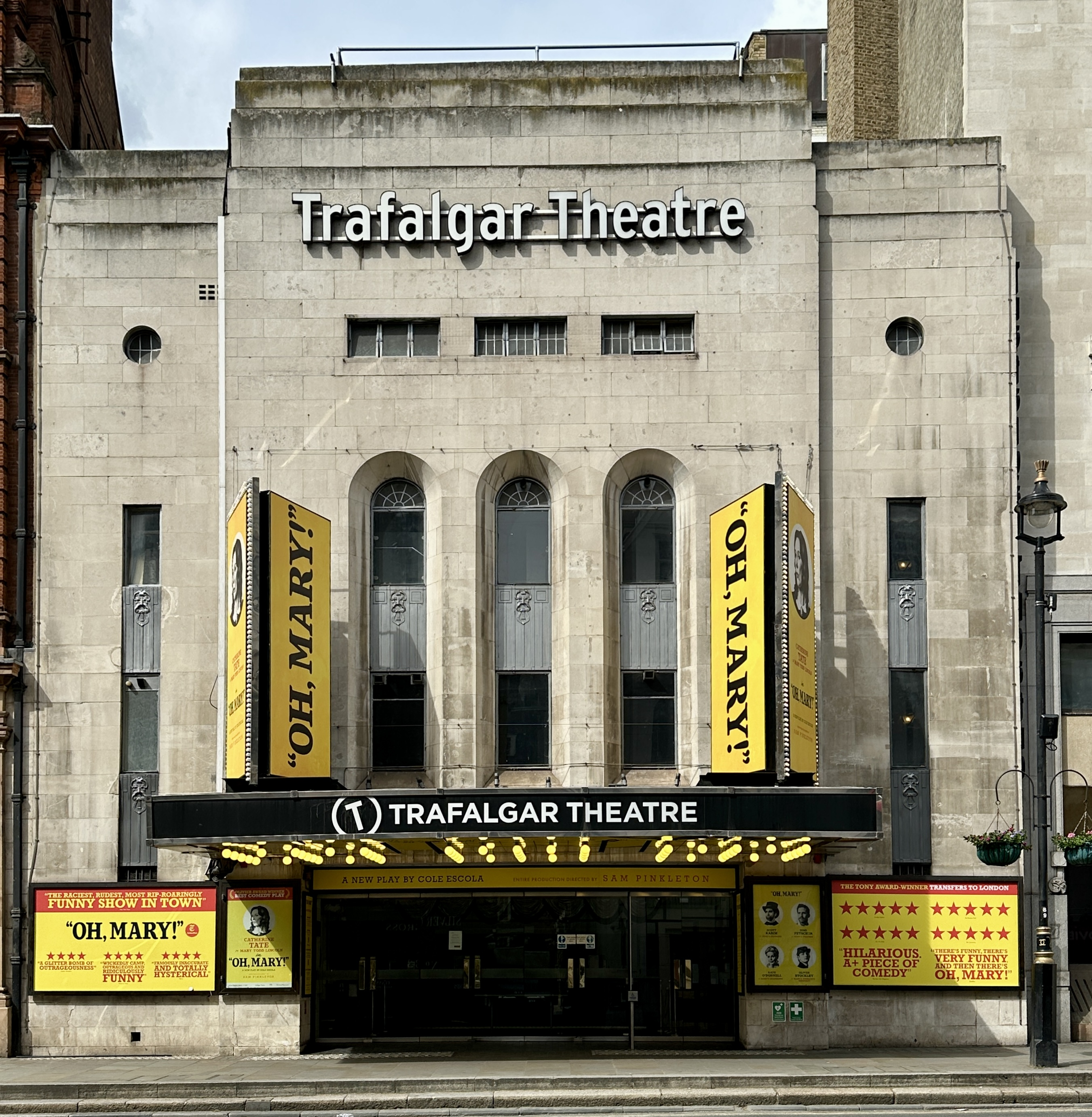
- Trafalgar Theatre in 2026
- Interactive map of Trafalgar Theatre
- Address: Whitehall; London, SW1; United Kingdom
- Owner: Trafalgar Entertainment
- Capacity: 630 seats
- Type: West End theatre
- Designation: Grade II
- Production: Oh, Mary!
- Public transit: Charing Cross; Charing Cross

Construction
- Opened: 29 September 1930; 95 years ago
- Rebuilt: 2004 (Tim Foster and John Muir) / 2020 (Foster Wilson Architects)
- Architect: Edward A. Stone

Website
- Trafalgar Theatre website

Trafalgar Theatre is a West End theatre in Whitehall, near Trafalgar Square, in the City of Westminster, London. The Grade II listed building was built in 1930 with interiors in the Art Deco style as the Whitehall Theatre; it regularly staged comedies and revues. It was converted into a television and radio studio in the 1990s, before returning to theatrical use in 2004 as Trafalgar Studios, the name it bore until 2020, with the auditorium converted to two studio spaces. It re-opened in 2021 following a major multi-million pound project to reinstate it to its original single-auditorium design.

== History ==
=== 1930 to 1996 ===
The original Whitehall Theatre, built on the site of the 17th century Ye Old Ship Tavern was designed by Edward A. Stone, with interiors in the Art Deco style by Marc-Henri and Laverdet. It had 634 seats. The theatre opened on 29 September 1930 with The Way to Treat a Woman by Walter Hackett, who was the theatre's licensee. In November 1933 Henry Daniell appeared there as Portman in Afterwards. Hackett presented several other plays of his own before leaving in 1934, and the theatre built its reputation for modern comedies throughout the rest of the decade. During World War II it housed revues, which had become commonplace entertainment throughout the West End. In 1942, The Whitehall Follies, featuring Phyllis Dixey, the first stripper to perform in the theatre district, opened with great fanfare and became an immediate success. Dixey leased the theatre and remained in it for the next five years.

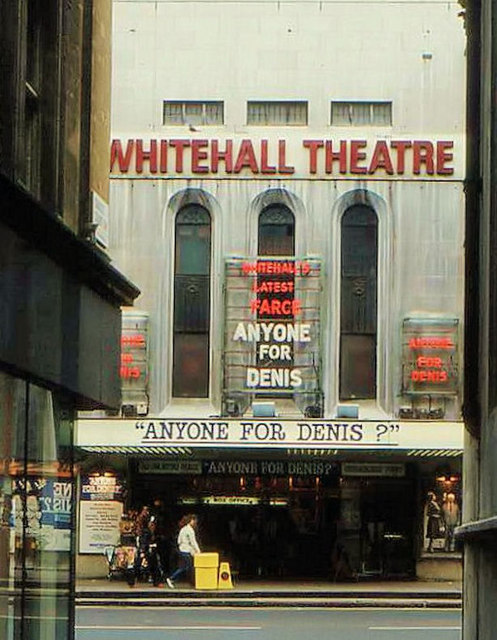
The Whitehall Theatre in 1981

A series of five long-running farces, presented under the umbrella title "Whitehall farce" by the actor-manager Brian Rix, were staged at the theatre from 1950 to 1966: Reluctant Heroes, by Colin Morris (1950–54); Dry Rot, by John Chapman (1954–58); Simple Spymen (1958–61); One For the Pot, by Ray Cooney and Tony Hilton (1961–64); and Chase Me, Comrade, by Cooney (1964–66). Excerpts from the shows were televised by the BBC.

The building was acquired in 1971 by Paul Raymond who was producer of a nude review that had opened there in 1969 called Pyjama Tops, it ran for five years after which productions including Ipi Tombi and Anyone for Denis? had successful runs. The building was shuttered until July 1982 when a production of Private Dick starring Robert Powell ran for 16 weeks. It then briefly housed an exhibition of World War II memorabilia known as The Whitehall Theatre of War. Acquired from the Paul Raymond Organisation in 1985 by Maybox Theatres the Theatre came under the direction of Ian Albery. After considerable refurbishment that retained most of its Art Deco features, it reopened on 5 March 1986 with a successful revival of J.B. Priestley's When We Are Married. Subsequent productions included When I Was a Girl I Used to Scream and Shout by Sharman Macdonald, The Importance of Being Earnest, The Foreigner, Run For Your Wife, Absurd Person Singular, Travels with My Aunt, tributes to Patsy Cline, Roy Orbison and the Blues Brothers, and solo performances by Ennio Marchetto and Maria Friedman.

=== 1997 to 2020 ===
Between 1997 and 1999, the theatre was converted into a television and radio studio used primarily to broadcast Jack Docherty's talk show and BBC Radio 4's Live from London. It returned to theatrical use, with such productions as Three Sisters, Puppetry of the Penis, "Art", Rat Pack Confidential, and Sing-a-Long-a-ABBA, before its owner, the Ambassador Theatre Group, announced the building would be reconfigured and reopen with a new name.

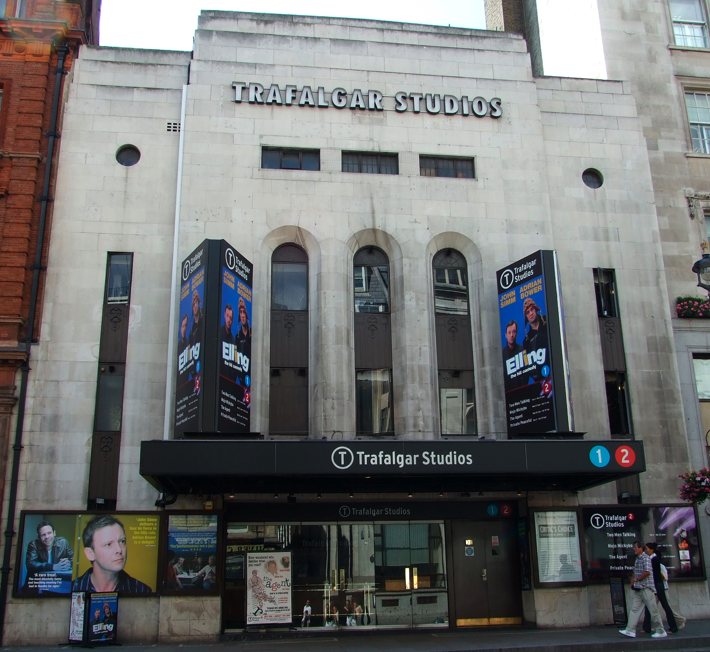
As Trafalgar Studios in 2007

The building was converted to consist of two intimate theatres designed by architects Tim Foster and John Muir. Studio 1, the larger of the two spaces with 380 seats, opened on 3 June 2004 with the Royal Shakespeare Company's production of Othello. Studio 2, with 100 seats, opened in October 2005 with the play Cyprus.

After 2004, Trafalgar Studios presented short runs of revivals of classic plays and musicals, including Sweeney Todd (2004); Losing Louis (2005); a season by the RSC repertory season, from December 2005 to February 2006, of plays including Sir Thomas More, Sejanus: His Fall and Believe What You Will; an adaptation of Jane Eyre by Polly Teale (2006); Bent (2006–07); Elling (2007); Dealer's Choice (2007–08); Fat Pig (2008, transferring to the Comedy Theatre); Entertaining Mr Sloane (2009) and A Christmas Carol (2010–11). Three Days in May showed at the theatre from November 2011 to March 2012.

The theatre was Grade II listed by English Heritage in December 1996, noting "The auditorium has a decorative cohesion and prettiness rare in theatres of its day, and has the best surviving original fabric of this type of theatre".

In May 2016, Howard Panter and Rosemary Squire, founders and former owners of Ambassador Theatre Group, announced they were stepping down from ATG to set up their own production company called Trafalgar Entertainment Group (TEG), which would take control of Trafalgar Studios.

=== 2020 to present ===
In May 2020, planning permission was granted to return the premises to a 630-seat theatre. Since the building's listed status meant the 2004 changes had to be reversible, it was possible for the theatre to be restored to its previous form. Westminster City Council granted the necessary planning permission and listed building consents to carry out the work. The venue closed earlier than expected in March 2020 due to the COVID-19 pandemic, and building work on the theatre began in the summer. On 27 October, Trafalgar Entertainment announced that the theatre would re-open as Trafalgar Theatre in Spring 2021. The restoration resulted in the restoration of a new single auditorium at an increased capacity and a larger stage, matching other theatre venues such as the Duke of York's and Vaudeville theatres. All seats at Trafalgar Theatre are on just two levels, stalls and dress circle. The redevelopment was overseen by Foster Wilson Architects. On 30 October, it was announced that Jersey Boys would be opening the new Trafalgar Theatre in April 2021. However, its opening was delayed to July 2021.

== Recent productions ==
Notable productions at the theater
Opening year	Name	Refs.
2025	Oh, Mary! starring Mason Alexander Park	
2025	Clarkston starring Joe Locke, Ruaridh Mollica, and Sophie Melville	
2025	Clueless	
2024	The Merchant of Venice 1936 starring Tracy-Ann Oberman	
2024	The Duchess (of Malfi) starring Jodie Whittaker	
2024	The 39 Steps	
2024	A Mirror starring Jonny Lee Miller	
2021	Jersey Boys	
2020	On Blueberry Hill	
2019	A Taste of Honey starring Jodie Prenger	
2019	A Day in the Death of Joe Egg starring Toby Stephens and Claire Skinner	
2019	Equus	
2019	Education, Education, Education written and devised by The Wardrobe Ensemble	
2019	Admissions starring Alex Kingston	
2018	Nine Night	
2018	Misty	
2018	Killer Joe starring Orlando Bloom	
2017	The Grinning Man	
2017	Apologia starring Stockard Channing and Freema Agyeman; written by Alexi Kaye Campbell)	
2016	The Naked Magicians	
2015	The Ruling Class starring James McAvoy	
2014	East Is East starring Jane Horrocks and Ayub Khan-Din	
2014	Richard III starring Martin Freeman	
2014	Another Country	
2013	The Pride	
2013	The Hothouse starring John Simm and Simon Russell Beale	
2013	Macbeth starring James McAvoy and Claire Foy	
2011	Three Days in May	

== Nearby Tube stations ==
- Charing Cross
- Embankment
- Westminster
