= Howard Panter =

British theatre producer

Sir Howard Panter
- Panter in 2010
- Born: Howard Hugh Panter
- Occupations: Theatre producer and manager
- Spouse: Rosemary Squire
- Children: 3

Sir Howard Hugh Panter is a British theatre impresario and theatre operator. With his wife Rosemary Squire he ran the Ambassador Theatre Group from about 1995 until 2016; they remain directors and shareholders of the company. When they left the active management of ATG, they bought Trafalgar Studios (the former Whitehall Theatre), which became the centre of a new company, Trafalgar Entertainment.

In a guide to "the 100 most influential people in UK theatre" published by The Stage, Panter and Squire were placed first each year from 2010 to 2016. In 2013 they were placed first in the theatre section of the Evening Standard 'Power 1000'.

Panter received a knighthood in the 2013 Birthday Honours.

== Career ==
In 1991, with Sir Eddie Kulukundis and the brothers Peter and John Beckwith, Panter became a director of a company which bought the Duke of York's Theatre and in 1992 was renamed The Duke Of York's Theatre (Holdings) Limited. It later bought the Ambassadors Theatre, and was again renamed, to Ambassador Theatre Group.

In 2016 Panter and Squire ceased to manage the Ambassador Theatre Group. They bought Trafalgar Studios (the former Whitehall Theatre) from the group, and made it the centre of a new company, Trafalgar Entertainment.

== Productions ==
=== Trafalgar Theatre Productions ===
Since 2017, Panter has served as Creative Director of Trafalgar Entertainment, whose production arm, Trafalgar Theatre Productions, produces and co-produces theatre in the UK and internationally.

Selected productions associated with Trafalgar Theatre Productions during Panter's tenure include:

- The Philanthropist (2017)
- Apologia (2017)
- The Grinning Man (2017)
- The Height of the Storm (2018)
- Mary Stuart (2018)
- Misty (2018)
- Nine Night (2018)
- The Messiah (2018–19)
- The King and I (2018–24, London, UK tour, Tokyo and international)
- The Rocky Horror Show (2018–present, UK and international tours)
- Admissions (2019)
- Education, Education, Education (2019)
- Equus (2019)
- A Day in the Death of Joe Egg (2019)
- The Starry Messenger (2019)
- A Taste of Honey (2019)
- On Blueberry Hill (2020)
- War Horse (2020, Australia and Asia-Pacific)
- Jagged Little Pill (2021, Australian production)
- Anything Goes (2021–22)
- Jersey Boys (2021–24)
- The Lehman Trilogy (2022, London and Sydney)
- The Merchant of Venice 1936 (2022–25)
- Clueless (2024)
- The Duchess (of Malfi) (2024)
- Kiss Me, Kate (2024)
- A Strange Loop (2024, National Theatre)
- Good Night, Oscar (2025)
- Fiddler on the Roof (2025–26)
- The Rocky Horror Show (2026, Broadway)
- High Society (2026)
- Death Note: The Musical (2026)
- The Ballad of Johnny & June (2026)

=== Ambassador Theatre Group Productions ===
Before founding Trafalgar Entertainment, Panter and Squire built and ran the ATG for its first 25 years. Selected productions and co-productions at ATG during Panter's time there include:

- The Rocky Horror Show (2000–02)
- Matthew Bourne's Nutcracker! (2002–03)
- Sweeney Todd: The Demon Barber of Fleet Street (2005–06, Broadway)
- Guys and Dolls (2005–07)
- Monty Python's Spamalot (2006–09)
- West Side Story (2008–09)
- Jersey Boys (2008–17)
- The Misanthrope (2009)
- Exit the King (2009, Broadway)
- South Pacific (2009–11, The Barbican)
- Legally Blonde the Musical (2009–12)
- Posh (2010)
- The Mountaintop (2011, Broadway)
- Jumpy (2011–12)
- Constellations (2012–13, Royal Court at the Duke of York's)
- Macbeth (2013)
- The Hothouse (2013)
- Richard III (2014)
- East is East (2014–15)
- Women on the Verge of a Nervous Breakdown (2014–15)
- The Ruling Class (2015)
- The Homecoming (2015–16)
- Oresteia (2015)

== Other roles ==
Panter is on the development board of LAMDA, and was chairman of the Rambert Dance Company for ten years. In March 2020 he was appointed chair of The Birmingham Rep Theatre. He is a director of Rocky Horror Company Limited.

== Reception ==
Panter and Squire have received a number of joint awards and recognitions:

- 2008 Ernst & Young "Entrepreneur of the Year": regional finalist
- 2010 Evening Standard Awards, "London's 1000 Most Influential People: Theatre": first place
- 2012 Manchester Evening News Awards, "250 of the most influential people in Greater Manchester"
- 2010–2016, The Stage "Top 100 People In British Theatre": first place
- 2019 Honorary Freedom of the Borough of Woking.

Panter received a knighthood in 2013 Queen's Birthday Honours for "services to theatre".

== Personal life ==
Panter met Rosemary Squire at the Queen's Theatre in London, where both were working during his production of And a Nightingale Sang with Patricia Routledge. Simon Callow was his best man at their wedding.
