= Clueless (musical) =

Musical based on the 1995 film of the same name

- The Musical
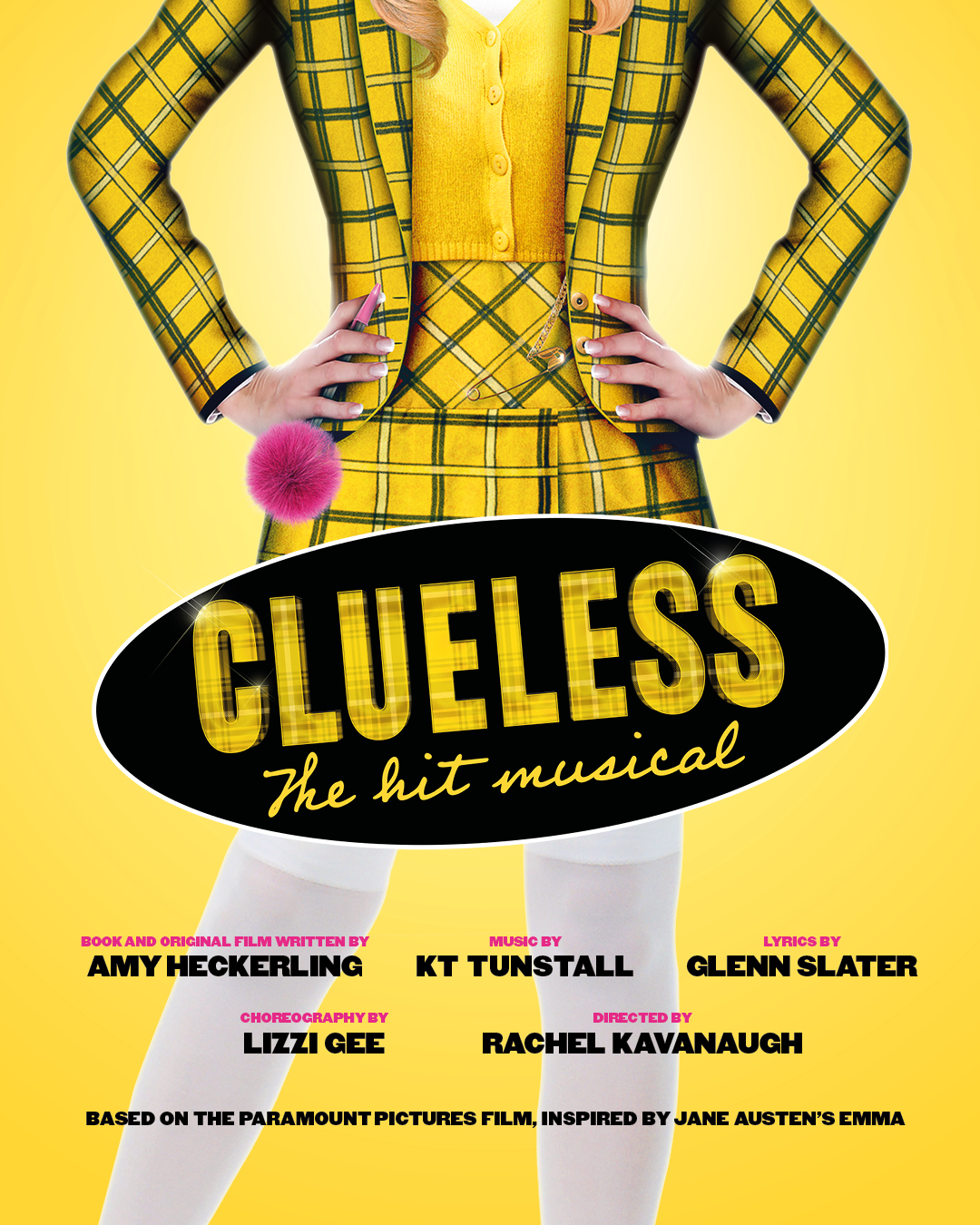
- Poster for the 2025 West End production
- Music: Various (2018 version); KT Tunstall (2024 version)
- Lyrics: Glenn Slater (2024 version)
- Book: Amy Heckerling
- Basis: Clueless by Amy Heckerling
- Premiere: November 20, 2018: The Alice Griffin Jewel Box Theatre, New York City
- Productions: 2018 Off-Broadway; 2024 Bromley; 2025 West End

Clueless, The Hit Musical is a musical with a book by Amy Heckerling based on her 1995 film, itself loosely based on Jane Austen's 1815 novel Emma, updating the setting to modern-day Beverly Hills.

The musical originally premiered as a jukebox musical Off-Broadway on November 20, 2018, with an official opening on December 11, in the Pershing Square Signature Center's Alice Griffin Jewel Box Theatre. Performances ran through January 12, 2019.

A new version of the musical with original music by KT Tunstall and with lyrics by Glenn Slater, had a work-in-progress engagement at the Churchill Theatre, Bromley from 12 to 24 February 2024, before being announced to begin performances in London's West End at the Trafalgar Theatre from February 2025. The West End production opened on March 13, 2025.

== Synopsis ==
Cher Horowitz is a popular, wealthy teenager living a picture perfect life in Beverly Hills ("Perfect"). Her father, Mel, is a lawyer and the two live in a mansion, sometimes joined by Josh, Cher's ex-step-brother. Tai, a new girl from New York, arrives at in town and Cher decides to make her her new project, making her popular ("New Girl").

== Productions ==
=== Off-Broadway (2018) ===
Poster for the original 2018 Off-Broadway production

The musical originally opened Off-Broadway at The Pershing Square Signature Center, produced by The New Group, on November 20, 2018, for a limited engagement until January 12, 2019. The production was directed by Kristin Hanggi, choreographed by Kelly Devine and the show's music supervision, arrangements and orchestration was provided by Ethan Popp. The production's design team included scenery by Beowulf Boritt, costumes by Amy Clark, lighting by Jason Lyons, sound by Gareth Owen, and projections by Darrel Maloney. The production stars Dove Cameron as the lead role. As a non-traditional jukebox musical, the show used '80s and '90s songs as the entire score, with lyric changes to fit the scene. It features classics such as "Torn" by Natalie Imbruglia, "Say My Name" by Destiny's Child, "Kids in America" by Kim Wilde, and "Beautiful Life" by Ace of Base.

=== Bromley tryout (2024) and West End (2025) ===
A new version of the musical made its UK premiere in a work-in-progress run at the Churchill Theatre, in Bromley from 12 to 24 February 2024. The new version features an original score by KT Tunstall and Glenn Slater and was directed by Sarna Lapine.

On 9 September 2024, it was announced that the musical will open in London's West End at the Trafalgar Theatre from February 2025, with Rachel Kavanaugh replacing Lapine as director and Lizzi Gee as choreographer. Emma Flynn & Keelan McAuley, who played Cher Horowitz & Josh Lucas respectively, both reprised their roles for the West End production. Full casting and creative teams were announced in January 2025. The show opened on March 13, 2025 It was originally meant to close in June 2025 but due to popular demand, it was extended to March 2026. However in July 2025, it was announced that the show would be closing on August 23, 2025. Simultaneously, they also announced a UK Tour set for 2026 where the tour would begin at the Churchill Theatre in Bromley, where the show first workshopped in the UK.

== Cast and characters ==
Character	Off-Broadway	Bromley	West End
Character	2018	2024	2025
Cher Horowitz	Dove Cameron	Emma Flynn	Emma Flynn
Dionne Davenport	Zurin Villanueva	Madison McBride	Chyna-Rose Frederick
Tai Frasier	Ephie Aardema	Annie Southall	Romona Lewis-Malley
Josh Lucas	Dave Thomas Brown	Keelan McAuley	Keelan McAuley
Mel Horowitz/Alphonse Hall/DMV Instructor/Mugger	Chris Hoch	Lloyd Gorman	Ryan O'Donnell
Amber Mariens	Tessa Grady	Holly Liburd	Emily Florence
Christian Stovitz	Justin Mortelliti	Solomon Davy	Isaac J Lewis
Miss Geist/ Millie Stoeger	Megan Sikora	Julie Yammanee	Imelda Warren-Green
Heather	Sara Andreas	?	Imelda Warren-Green
Lucy	Danielle Marie Gonzalez	Jacqueline Hughes	Imelda Warren-Green
Murray Duvall	Gilbert L. Bailey II	Simeon Wynne	Rabi Kondé
Travis Birkenstock	Will Connolly	Owen Lloyd	Blake Jordan
Elton Tiscia	Brett Thiele	Tom Liggins	Max Mirza
Summer	Talya Groves	Ellen Hillman	Aoife Kenny
Haley			Sophie Elmes
Tiffany			Grace Eleanor Thomas
Dylan			Jacob Fisher
Kyle			Ernest Stroud
Chad			Josh Latunji
Finn/Band Singer			James Lim
Swing			Lucy Rice Rachel Seirian Dylan Gordon-Jones Lucas Lluna
Sean Holliday	Darius Jordan Lee	?	
Max	L’ogan J’ones	?	

== Musical numbers ==
=== Original Off-Broadway production (Jukebox musical) ===
Act I

Song	Original artist	Performer(s)
"Beautiful Life"	Ace of Base	Cher and Ensemble
"Shoop"	Salt-N-Pepa	Murray and Male Ensemble
"Little Miss Can't Be Wrong"	Spin Doctors	Cher, Josh, Teachers and Female Ensemble
"No Scrubs"	TLC	Cher and Ensemble
"You Gotta Be"	Des'ree	Cher, Dionne and Ensemble
"How Am I Supposed to Live Without You"	Laura Branigan	Mr. Hall, Miss Geist, Cher, Dionne and Ensemble
"U Can't Touch This"	MC Hammer	Company
"Supermodel"	Jill Sobule	Cher, Dionne, Tai and Ensemble
"Barbie Girl"	Aqua	Cher, Dionne, Tai, Murray and Female Ensemble
"Groove Is in the Heart"	Deee-Lite	Tai, Murray and Company
"Torn"	Ednaswap	Cher and Josh

Act II

Song	Original artist	Performer(s)
"My Lovin' (You're Never Gonna Get It)"	En Vogue	Tai, Cher, Dionne and Female Ensemble
"A Girl Like You"	Edwyn Collins	Christian, Cher, Dionne, Tai and Ensemble
"Dammit"	Blink-182	Cher, Josh, The Band and Ensemble
"Dammit" (Reprise)	Blink-182	Cher and Josh
"Bye Bye Bye"	NSYNC	Cher, Christian and Company
"Mmmm Mmmm Mmmm Mmmm"	Crash Test Dummies	Travis
"What's Up?"	4 Non Blondes	Cher
"She's So High"	Tal Bachman	Cher and Josh
"You Get What You Give"	New Radicals	Cher and Company
"Kids in America"	Kim Wilde	Full Company

=== Original London production ===
Act I

- Perfect - Cher, Dionne and Ensemble
- Perfect (Reprise) - Cher
- Get Involved - Cher, Dionne, Mr. Hall, Ms. Geist
- Hopeless Case - Tai
- New Girl - Cher, Dionne, Tai and Ensemble
- Human Barbies - Josh
- The Best - Elton and Ensemble
- Party in the Val - Ensemble
- Whatever - Cher

Act II

- Boom, Pow - Ensemble
- Reasonable Doubts - Josh and Ensemble
- I'm Keeping My Eye on You - Ensemble
- Tonight is the Night - Cher
- She's All That - Ensemble
- The Driving Test - Cher
- Clueless - Cher and Josh
- Perfect (Reprise) - Cher, Josh, Dionne, Tai and Ensemble

== Critical response ==
Clueless, The Musical Off Broadway received mixed reviews. Frank Rizzo of Variety called the narrative "lightweight" but praised the overall look and tone of the show. Rizzo, describing Kelly Devine's choreography, said "its teen-energy moves are a constant pleasure". Rizzo also said that "Beowulf Boritt’s design essentials are rad and Amy Clark’s costumes recall the too-cool-to-care designs of the period and its stylish plaids and pleats". Rizzo also praised the music selection for show, calling Amy Heckerling's reworking of the lyrics "crafty".

David Rooney of The Hollywood Reporter found the show "hit-or-miss". Rooney praised that the show stuck closely to the original's plot but criticized that there was no element of surprise. Rooney wrote that "in comparison to other teen classics retooled for the stage, like Mean Girls, Heathers: The Musical or Bring It On, the show rarely steps out from the shadow of its screen source with anything new to offer."

Clueless, The Musical West End received good reviews. Nick Curtis in The Standard said it is "powerfully sung, and actually, like, kinda fun". Curits went on to say "in the ranks of musical adaptations of cult movies, this is almost as good as Legally Blonde, and it’s what Mean Girls should have been. If you don’t enjoy it, frankly you must be buggin’."

"Gals and gays, welcome to your new favorite musical" said Alun Hood in WhatsOnStage. Hood also praised lead Emma Flynn in the role of Cher Horowitz, saying "apart from the numbers, many of which are bona fide bangers... the principal distinguishing feature of Clueless is its leading lady. As Cher, who’s surely first cousin to Elle Woods and Wicked’s Glinda, American newcomer Emma Flynn is delivering the most entrancing West End musical debut since Eva Noblezada broke our hearts in Miss Saigon."

The Stage called the show "bright, breezy satire" and a "vibrant adaptation of the 1995 teen movie bolstered by a catchy original score by KT Tunstall. This West End transfer, directed with verve by Rachel Kavanaugh, embraces the satirical spirit of the original, while allowing plenty of room for Tunstall and Slater’s musical numbers to shine."

The Times said "there is plenty to enjoy in Rachel Kavanaugh’s production at the Trafalgar Theatre. While a jukebox version of the movie enjoyed a run off-Broadway in 2018, this is a more ambitious offering."

The Independent said "it’s a bit light on the catchy songs and easy-to-imitate dance routines that can pull in younger fandoms. Still, it’s a welcome excuse to revisit a classic, sewn together with just enough originality to make it feel like a stylish homage, not a cynical knock-off." "This is by no means a show for the ages, but it makes for a pleasant enough evening out," said The i Paper.
