= ATG Entertainment =

International live entertainment organisation

- Type: Limited company
- Industry: Entertainment
- Founded: 1994
- Headquarters: Woking, Surrey, United Kingdom
- Number of locations: 70+ (UK, USA, Spain & Germany)
- Key people: Melanie Smith (Chief Executive); John Oldcorn (Chief Financial Officer); Michael Lynas (Chief Content Officer)
- Owner: Providence Equity Partners LLP
- Number of employees: 11,000 (December 2022)
- Website: Official website

ATG Entertainment, formerly The Ambassador Theatre Group (ATG), is a major international live entertainment organisation headquartered in the United Kingdom, with offices in Woking (head office), London, New York, San Francisco, San Antonio, Madrid, Mannheim and Cologne. ATG's key operations comprise three inter-related activities: venue ownership and management, ticketing and marketing operations, and show productions.

ATG runs more than 64 venues in Britain, the US and Germany. The company is among the most prolific theatre producers in the world with co-productions in the UK, New York, across North America, Europe, Asia and Australia. It is involved in event ticketing services through ATG Tickets, LOVEtheatre and Group Line.

The company was founded and run by the husband-and-wife team of Sir Howard Panter and Dame Rosemary Squire OBE, who topped The Stage 100 list of prominent UK theatre personalities from 2010 to 2016.

== Business model ==
ATG's business model involves the combination of theatre ownership with production management, marketing and ticket operations. ATG manages (and in some cases owns) venues, mainly theatres, which host shows for paying audiences, including shows created by its production functions. ATG's production functions create shows, which are hired out for performance at theatres including theatres managed by ATG, and ATG's ticketing and marketing function sells and charges fees for selling tickets, for venues including those owned by ATG.

== Theatre ownership and management ==
ATG manages more than 70 theatres and one cinema in the UK, US, Spain and Germany. ATG's portfolio of 10 West End theatres include the Ambassadors, Apollo Victoria, Fortune, Harold Pinter, Lyceum, Phoenix, Piccadilly, Playhouse, Savoy and Tom Stoppard,. ATG also has UK regional theatres in Aylesbury, Birmingham, Brighton, Bristol, Edinburgh, Folkestone, Glasgow, Liverpool, Manchester, Milton Keynes, Oxford, Richmond, Sunderland, Stoke-on-Trent, Stockton on Tees, Torquay, Wimbledon, Woking and York.

In the US, ATG controls seven Broadway theatres, the Lyric Theatre, and the Hudson Theatre, the latter leased from a subsidiary of Millennium & Copthorne Hotels. In 2015, ATG acquired ACE Theatrical Group, giving ATG control of the King's Theatre in Brooklyn, New York; the Saenger Theatre and Mahalia Jackson Theater of the Performing Arts in New Orleans, Louisiana; and the Majestic Theatre and Charline McCombs Empire Theatre in San Antonio, Texas. In 2023, President of Jujamcyn Theaters, Jordan Roth sold a 93% stake of their five Broadway Theaters. This acquisition includes the August Wilson, the Walter Kerr, the Eugene O'Neill, the Al Hirschfield, and the St. James Theatre.

Also in 2015, ATG became leaseholder and took over the management of the Theatre Royal, Sydney's oldest theatrical institution, one of the city's premier venues and ATG's first theatre in the Asia-Pacific region, though the New South Wales government closed the venue in 2016.

ATG is the majority shareholder of BB Group, One of the leading producers and promoters of premium live entertainment in Europe, with a particular strength in touring musicals and dance productions throughout Germany, Austria and Switzerland. BB Group productions include West Side Story, We Will Rock You, The Rocky Horror Show, Cats, Alvin Ailey American Dance Theater and Ballet Revolución, The Lion King and The Bodyguard. BB Group has won the tender to re-develop the Staatenhaus in Cologne as a 1700-seat theatre.

== Theatre producing activity ==
ATG has its own producing arm, ATG Productions. ATG 's production activities expanded with the launch of Theatre Royal Brighton Productions and the formation of producing partnerships with directors Jerry Mitchell and Jamie Lloyd in 2011 and 2012. ATG has a number of major production company initiatives and partnerships including Jerry Mitchell Productions, Theatre Royal Brighton Productions and Jaime Lloyd Productions.

ATG has a group partner company, Sonia Friedman Productions (SFP), a West End and Broadway production company responsible for major theatre productions in London and on Broadway in recent years. Recent SFP West End and Broadway theatre productions and co-productions include the UK premiere of The Book of Mormon, Jez Butterworth's The River on Broadway, starring Hugh Jackman; The Nether, Bend It Like Beckham: the Musical, Hamlet, starring Benedict Cumberbatch; Electra, King Charles III, Sunny Afternoon, Shakespeare in Love, Jerusalem, Ghosts, Mojo, Chimerica, Twelfth Night, Richard III and Old Times. Friedman also collaborated with J. K. Rowling on the 2016 stage play based on the Harry Potter stories, Harry Potter and the Cursed Child, in co-production with Colin Callender.

=== Current and recent ATG co-productions ===
Current and recent ATG co-productions include The End of Longing, starring Matthew Perry; The Maids, starring Uzo Aduba, Zawe Ashton and Laura Carmichael; The Homecoming, starring John Simm, Gary Kemp and Keith Allen; The Ruling Class, starring James McAvoy; Oresteia, Women on the Verge of a Nervous Breakdown, starring Tamsin Greig; East is East, starring Jane Horrocks; Richard III, starring Martin Freeman; Dirty Rotten Scoundrels, starring Robert Lindsay; Jersey Boys, Priscilla Queen of the Desert, starring Jason Donovan / Duncan James; Inala, Love Me Tender, Macbeth, starring James McAvoy; The Hothouse, starring Simon Russell Beale and John Simm; Passion Play, starring Zöe Wanamaker; Posh, Jumpyand Constellations (Royal Court at the Duke of York's); Dolly Patron's 9 to 5 – the Musical, Legally Blonde – the Musical, Monty Python's Spamalot, The Rocky Horror Show, Goodnight Mister Tom, The Mystery of Charles Dickens, starring Simon Callow, South Pacific, starring Samantha Womack and Paulo Szot; All New People, starring Zach Braff; Ghost – the Musical , Matthew Bourne's Nutcracker!, Being Shakespeare, starring Simon Callow; The Misanthrope, starring Damian Lewis and Keira Knightley; West Side Story, Elling, starring John Simm; and Guys and Dolls, starring Ewan McGregor.

=== Older productions ===
ATG's earlier productions include the co-production of The Weir in London and on Broadway; Smokey Joe's Cafe in the West End; Slava's Snowshow in the West End and North America; and the musical Carmen Jones.

=== Broadway productions ===
Recent ATG productions on Broadway include The Mountaintop, starring Samuel L. Jackson and Angela Bassett; Exit the King, starring Geoffrey Rush and Susan Sarandon; and John Doyle's production of Stephen Sondheim's Sweeney Todd: the Demon Barber Fleet Street. ATG also co-produced Constellations on Broadway and currently co-producing The King and I with Lincoln Center Theater.

=== Productions in Australia ===
ATG's productions in Australia include Ghost the Musical, Legally Blonde – the Musical, Thriller Live, The Rocky Horror Show, Guys and Dolls and West Side Story.

== Ticketing and marketing operations ==
ATG runs ATG Tickets, which provides the in-house ticketing services to ATG's UK theatres and manages ATG's Theatre Card membership programme and ticketing promotional partnerships. The ticketing website atgtickets.com was launched in 2008 and has since been recognised by Hitwise as the UK's number one theatre ticketing website, with 20 million unique visits per annum.

In 2011, ATG Theatre Card, the UK's largest paid-for theatre membership scheme was launched. Ticket Machine Group, a long established ticket agency, was acquired by ATG in 2013.

== LOVEtheatre.com and Group Line ==
In 2013, in order to increase the variety and scope of its operation, ATG acquired the Ticket Machine Group with its brands, Group Line and LOVEtheatre.com, both of whom continue to be major ticket agencies in their own right in London.

== History ==
=== Beginnings ===
Squire and Panter had known each other since 1979, and Panter offered Squire a job after she was made redundant in 1986. The company now known as ATG began through Panter meeting property developer brothers Peter and John Beckwith. The Beckwiths' company, London and Edinburgh Trust, was working on a development in Woking, Surrey, that was to include an arts and entertainment complex, and the Beckwiths asked Panter and Squire to plan and manage it. When London and Edinburgh Trust was sold before the Woking development was completed in 1992, a structure was set up that allowed Panter and Squire to continue to run the theatre. Around that time the ATG company was established, with founding investors including Eddie Kulukundis.

In February 1992 ATG bought the Duke of York's Theatre from Capital Radio, with significant support from Kulukundis. In 1995, ATG bought its second London theatre, the Ambassadors. The company also bid successfully for contracts to manage new theatres being launched in Milton Keynes and Stoke-on-Trent.

=== ACT deal ===
ATG underwent major expansion in 2000 through the acquisition of seven West End theatres from Associated Capital Theatres (ACT): the Albery (now named the Noël Coward), the Comedy (now named the Harold Pinter), Donmar Warehouse, Phoenix, Piccadilly, Whitehall (now Trafalgar Studios) and Wyndham's theatres. Expansion required the involvement of larger corporate investors including AREA Property Partners and Carlton Television.

Subsequent deals included taking on the running of theatres in Bromley, Richmond and Glasgow.

=== Live Nation deal ===
In November 2009, ATG consolidated its position as the major UK theatre owner by purchasing the Live Nation UK theatre portfolio of 16 venues in England and Scotland in a £90 million acquisition. Live Nation sold the theatres as part of a business decision of "selling off assets that are not core to our live music strategy". At that time Exponent Private Equity became the new majority owner of ATG by financing the theatre takeover. Exponent provided at least £75m of financing for the deal, which valued ATG at £150m. Coinciding with the expansion, former BBC director general Greg Dyke joined ATG in a new role of executive chairman.

Potential competition concerns led to an investigation by the UK Office of Fair Trading (OFT). Its conclusion was that "the OFT does not believe that it is or may be the case that the merger has resulted or may be expected to result in a substantial lessening of competition within a market or markets in the United Kingdom" and "[t]his merger will therefore not be referred to the Competition Commission".

=== Expansion outside the UK ===
In 2012, ATG indicated an intention to expand into international theatre ownership, possibly in Australia and China. This included the appointment of Tim McFarlane as CEO for ATG Asia/Pacific. In November 2012 ATG announced it would establish a regional headquarters in Sydney.

ATG's acquisition of Broadway's Foxwoods Theatre in May 2013 heralded the company's US debut, with Panter commenting, "Ownership of The Foxwoods Theatre within the group will provide a catalyst to expand in the North American market." (In March 2014, ATG renamed the venue the Lyric Theatre, following the end of the naming sponsorship deal.)

Later in 2013, global private equity firm buyout firm Providence Equity Partners purchased became a majority shareholder in ATG from Exponent. Exponent retains a minority stake in ATG as part of the deal and continues to work with Providence and the existing management team including Joint CEO's and co-founders Sir Howard Panter and Rosemary Squire OBE. Greg Dyke continues in his role as ATG chairman.

In August 2015, ATG became leaseholder and took over the management of the Theatre Royal, Sydney's oldest theatrical institution – marking ATG's first theatre in Asia Pacific. In September of the same year, ATG acquired ACE Theatrical Group. ACE operates the King's Theatre in Brooklyn, New York; the Saenger Theatre in New Orleans, Louisiana; the Mahalia Jackson Theater for the Performing Arts in New Orleans, Louisiana; the Majestic Theatre in San Antonio, Texas; and the Charline McCombs Empire Theatre in San Antonio, Texas. In December 2015, ATG announced that through its subsidiary, Hudson Theatre LLC, ATG entered a long-term lease for the Hudson Theatre, its second theatre on Broadway, from a subsidiary of Millennium & Copthorne Hotels plc group of companies (M&C).

In February 2023, it was announced that ATG would merge with Jujamcyn Theaters. In July 2023, Jordan Roth sold a 93 percent stake in Jujamcyn's five theaters to ATG and Providence Equity. In exchange, Roth bought a 7 percent ownership stake in ATG's two other Broadway theaters, the Lyric Theatre and the Hudson Theatre.

In 2024, ATG acquired Celebrity Attractions, which presented shows at the Tulsa Performing Arts Center in Tulsa, Oklahoma, Robinson Center in Little Rock, Arkansas and Juanita K. Hammons Hall for the Performing Arts in Springfield, Missouri.

In 2026, Ari Emanuel's holding company MARI reached a deal to buy Providence Equity's stake in ATG. The terms of the deal were not released but were estimated by The Hollywood Reporter at $6 billion.

== Ownership ==
ATG is controlled by Providence Equity Partners.

== List of venues managed by ATG ==
=== Theatres ===
Start year indicates the year of ATG's first involvement, End year indicates the last year of ATG involvement (where applicable).

In terms of ownership, it is often unclear whether ATG owns the freehold to a theatre or a leasehold: reports use terms such as buy, purchase and own, but rarely specify whether they are referring to the freehold or to a leasehold.

==== Current venues ====
===== West End =====
Venue	Location	Start year	Seating capacity	Notes
Ambassadors Theatre	London	1995	406	Stephen Waley-Cohen acquired the Ambassadors from ATG in 2007. ATG reacquired it in 2018.
Apollo Victoria Theatre	London	2009	2,328	Part of the Live Nation deal.
Fortune Theatre	London	2001	432	
Harold Pinter Theatre	London	2000	836	Part of the ACT Theatres deal.
Lyceum Theatre	London	2009	2,116	Part of the Live Nation deal.
Phoenix Theatre	London	2000	1,233	Part of the ACT Theatres deal.
Piccadilly Theatre	London	2000	1,184	Part of the ACT Theatres deal.
Playhouse Theatre	London	2003	775	
Savoy Theatre	London	2005	1,113	
Tom Stoppard Theatre	London	1992	646	

===== UK regional =====
Venue	Location	Start year	Seating capacity	Notes
The Alexandra	Birmingham	2009	1,347	ATG acquired the theatre as part of the Live Nation deal.
Aylesbury Waterside Theatre	Aylesbury	2009	1,198	ATG manages the theatre under a 15-year contract (from 2010 to 2025) with Aylesbury Vale District Council, with the council paying ATG approx £1.75m for the 2010–2015 period.
Bristol Hippodrome	Bristol	2009	1,951	ATG acquired the theatre as part of the Live Nation deal.
Edinburgh Playhouse	Edinburgh	2009	3,039	ATG acquired the theatre as part of the Live Nation deal.
Stockton Globe	Stockton on Tees	2019	3,000	New contract
Grand Opera House	York	2009	1,028	ATG acquired the theatre as part of the Live Nation deal.
King's Theatre, Glasgow	Glasgow	2002	1,785	ATG manages the theatre under a lease, via subsidiary Glasgow Theatres Ltd., from Glasgow City Council on a 21-year lease from 2002.
Leas Cliff Hall	Folkestone	2009	1,004	ATG manages the theatre for Shepway District Council under contract.
Liverpool Empire Theatre	Liverpool	2009	2,381	ATG manages the theatre on behalf of The Empire Theatre (Merseyside) Trust Ltd., a trust set up by Merseyside County Council in 1979 when MCC rescued the theatre, then scheduled for closure by Moss Empires.
Manchester Opera House	Manchester	2009	1,915	ATG acquired the theatre as part of the Live Nation deal.
Milton Keynes Theatre	Milton Keynes	1998	1,438	ATG manages the theatre (through a wholly owned subsidiary, Milton Keynes Theatre Ltd.) for the Milton Keynes Theatre & Gallery Company (a charitable body). ATG were appointed as theatre operator in 1998, the venue opened in 1999.
New Theatre Oxford	Oxford	2009	1,785	ATG manages the theatre under a lease from Oxford City Council.
New Victoria Theatre	Woking	1995	1,331	Panter and Squire were involved with the theatre from 1992, but ATG did not purchase it until 1995.
New Wimbledon Studio	Wimbledon, London	2003	80	ATG manage the theatre for the London Borough of Merton and charitable trust Wimbledon Civic Theatre Trust, and lease it from them under a 30-year lease from 2003.
New Wimbledon Theatre	Wimbledon, London	2003	1,622	ATG manage the theatre for the London Borough of Merton and charitable trust Wimbledon Civic Theatre Trust, and lease it from them under a 30-year lease from 2003.
Norman Bragg Studio	Aylesbury	2009	N/A	Renamed from Second Space in March 2022
Palace Theatre	Manchester	2009	1,998	ATG acquired the theatre as part of the Live Nation deal.
Princess Theatre	Torquay	2009	1,491	ATG manage the theatre which they lease from Torbay Council. Lease acquired as part of the Live Nation deal.
Regent Theatre	Stoke-on-Trent	1997	1,615	The theatre opened in 1999 (following its earlier life mostly as a cinema) following an agreement with ATG to manage the theatre.
Rhoda McGaw Theatre	Woking	1995	228	ATG manage the theatre jointly with Woking Borough Council as a community performance space.
Richmond Theatre	Richmond, London	2000	864	ATG manages the theatre via Richmond Theatre Management Ltd., a wholly owned trading subsidiary of the Richmond Theatre Trust Ltd., which is a charitable body with trustees appointed by the London Borough of Richmond upon Thames and by ATG.
Sunderland Empire	Sunderland	2009	2,200	ATG manages the theatre on behalf of Sunderland City Council and the Sunderland Empire Theatre Trust (whose trustees are appointed by the council).
Swansea Arena	Swansea	2020	3,500	New contract
Theatre Royal, Brighton	Brighton	1999	969	ATG owns and manages the theatre.
Theatre Royal, Glasgow	Glasgow	2006	1,555	ATG manages the venue for owners Scottish Opera.
Victoria Hall	Stoke-on-Trent	1997	1,349	The theatre re-opened in 1998 under ATG's management.

===== Broadway =====
Venue	Location	Start year	Seating capacity	Notes
Al Hirschfeld Theatre	New York City	2023	1,412	Acquired in a merger with Jujamcyn
August Wilson Theatre	New York City	2023	1,222	Acquired in a merger with Jujamcyn
Eugene O'Neill Theatre	New York City	2023	1,030	Acquired in a merger with Jujamcyn
Hudson Theatre	New York City	2015	970	Long-term lease from subsidiary of Millennium & Copthorne Hotels plc
Lyric Theatre	New York City	2013	1,622	ATG operate the theatre, which is leased from New 42nd Street, through its subsidiary Lyric Theatre LLC.
St. James Theatre	New York City	2023	1,701	Acquired in a merger with Jujamcyn
Walter Kerr Theatre	New York City	2023	931	Acquired in a merger with Jujamcyn

===== US regional =====
Venue	Location	Start year	Seating capacity	Notes
Charline McCombs Empire Theatre	San Antonio	2015	856	Acquired from ACE Theatrical Group
Colonial Theatre	Boston	2017	1,700	40-year lease from Emerson College
Curran Theatre	San Francisco	2019	1,667	Took over management
The Espree	San Antonio	2022	3,175	Took over the management in March 2023
Fisher Theatre	Detroit	2021	2,089	Bought during pandemic
Golden Gate Theatre	San Francisco	2021	2,297	Bought during pandemic
Kings Theatre (Brooklyn)	Brooklyn, New York City	2015	3,000	Acquired from ACE Theatrical Group
Mahalia Jackson Theater for the Performing Arts	New Orleans	2015	2,153	Acquired from ACE Theatrical Group
Majestic Theatre	San Antonio	2015	2,264	Acquired from ACE Theatrical Group
Orpheum Theatre	San Francisco	2021	2,203	Bought during pandemic
Robinson Center	Little Rock, Arkansas	2024	2,222	Programming only, acquired with Celebrity Attractions
Saenger Theatre	New Orleans	2015	2,613	Acquired from ACE Theatrical Group
Smart Financial Centre	Sugar Land, Texas	2015	6,400	Acquired from ACE Theatrical Group
Tulsa Performing Arts Center	Tulsa, Oklahoma	2024	2,365	Programming only, acquired with Celebrity Attractions

===== Germany =====
Venue	Location	Start year	Seating capacity	Notes
Admiralspalast	Berlin	2018	1,756	Acquired in Mehr! Entertainment purchase
Capitol Theater	Düsseldorf	2018	1,250	Acquired in Mehr! Entertainment purchase
Mehr! Theater am Großmarkt	Hamburg	2018	2,418	Acquired in Mehr! Entertainment purchase
Musical Dome	Cologne	2018	1,700	Acquired in Mehr! Entertainment purchase
Starlight Express Theater	Bochum	2018	1,650	Acquired in Mehr! Entertainment purchase

==== Former venues ====
Venue	Location	Start year	End year	Seating capacity	Notes
Arts at the Old Fire Station	Oxford	2009	2010	N/A	Acquired as part of the Live Nation deal. ATG surrendered the lease to Crisis, the charity for homeless people, in 2010.
Churchill Theatre	Bromley	2000	2016	781	ATG managed the theatre under a 5-year contract (from April 2011) from Bromley Council, following their original 10-year contract from January 2000.
Donmar Warehouse	London	2000	2017	271	ATG formerly owned the theatre, which is managed by Donmar Warehouse Projects Ltd. (DWPL), a registered charity. Ownership of the theatre building passed to DWPL in 2016.
Noël Coward Theatre	London	2000	2005	942	Part of the ACT Theatres deal. In 2005 the lease on the theatre reverted from ATG to the Salisbury Estate who granted a new lease to Delfont Mackintosh Theatres.
Southport Theatre	Southport	2009	2018	1,630	ATG leased the theatre from Sefton Council Council under a contract assumed as part of the Live Nation deal.
Theatre Royal, Sydney	Sydney	2015	2016	1,100	ATG became leaseholders & took over management. Closed for refurbishment August 2016. Reopened 2021 under Trafalgar Entertainment management.
Trafalgar Studios	London	2000	2016	379	Part of the ACT Theatres deal. Originally named the Whitehall Theatre, ATG renamed the venue in 2004. Sold to ATG founders Panter and Squire when they left ATG in 2016. Now named Trafalgar Theatre, and returned to one auditorium
Wyndham's Theatre	London	2000	2005	799	Part of the ACT Theatres deal. The lease reverted to Delfont Mackintosh Theatres in 2005.

=== Cinema ===
ATG also operate the six-screen Nova Cinema, Woking, in the same complex that contains the New Victoria and Rhoda McGaw theatres.
