= Polly Teale =

British theatre director and playwright (born 1962)

- Born: December 1962 (age 63); East Grinstead
- Occupations: Theatre director; playwright; art therapist
- Website: www.pollytealetherapy.co.uk

Polly Teale (born December 1962) is a British theatre director and playwright best known for her work with the Shared Experience theatre company, of which she was an artistic director.

== Career ==
In 2002, Teale directed a production of Helen Edmundson's award-winning play The Clearing at the Tricycle Theatre. In 2012, she directed Edmundson's Mary Shelley, which was produced by Shared Experience on tour, including at the Tricycle Theatre and the Liverpool Playhouse.

== Plays ==
- Jane Eyre (1998)
- After Mrs Rochester (2003)
- Brontë (2011)
