= John Beckwith (British businessman) =

British businessman (born 1947)

- Born: 1947
- Education: Harrow School
- Occupation: businessman

Sir John Lionel Beckwith, CBE (born 19 March 1947) is a British businessman.

== Personal life ==
John Beckwith was born on 19 March 1947. He was educated at Harrow School.

He is reportedly a "sport fanatic" and, as of 2011, had run four marathons.

He is the uncle of socialite Tamara Beckwith.

== Career ==
Beckwith qualified as a Chartered Accountant with Beresford Lye & Co, then worked at Arthur Andersen & Co from 1969 to 1971. In 1971, together with his brother Peter, he established the London and Edinburgh Trust PLC which they soon made one of the United Kingdom's top ten real estate companies. Beckwith served as chairman until 1993.

In 1986, Beckwith founded Rutland Trust PLC, a diversified corporate finance, venture capital and insurance broking group, where he served as chairman until 1991. In 1993, Beckwith founded the private investment company Pacific Investments PLC. In 2007, Rutland Trust PLC merged with August Equity Trust PLC to form New Star Private Equity Investment Trust PLC.

== Philanthropy ==
Beckwith is Founder and President of Youth Sport Trust, an independent charity devoted to changing young people's lives through sport. He is a Vice President of the Royal National Institute of Blind People. He is a Patron of the Teenage Cancer Trust and was a member of the Development Board of the Cancer Relief Macmillan Fund (later Macmillan Cancer Support).

Beckwith established the Sir John Beckwith Charitable Trust in 1987 with the announced aim of helping a broad spectrum of charitable bodies. Between April 1993 and April 2010, the Trust made donations totalling £6.87 million across a range of educational, sports, arts, medical and community organisations.

== Political activity ==
Beckwith is a major Conservative Party donor and gave £250,000 to the party during the 2019 United Kingdom general election campaign.

== Honours ==
In 1996, Beckwith was made Commander of the Order of the British Empire (CBE), and in 2002 he was knighted for his service to youth sports. In 2000 he was awarded an honorary Doctor of Letters degree (Hon DLitt) by Loughborough University.
