= Regent Theatre, Stoke-on-Trent =

Theatre in Stoke-on-Trent, England

Coordinates: 53.0244°N 2.1765°W

Regent Theatre
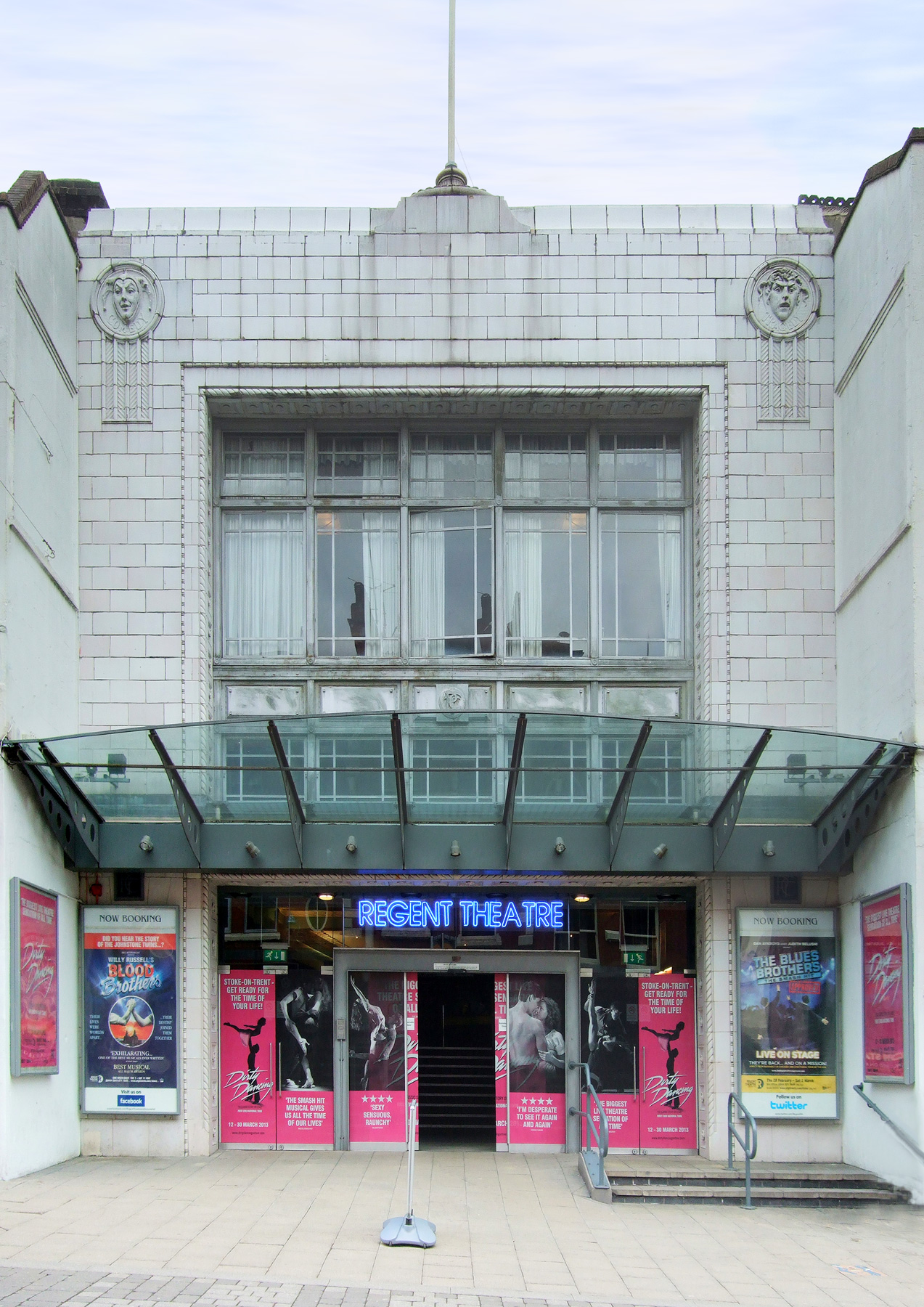
- The main entrance
- Interactive map of Regent Theatre
- Address: Picadilly; Stoke-on-Trent; England
- Owner: Ambassador Theatre Group
- Capacity: 1,600
- Type: Theatre

Construction
- Opened: 1929 (as Super Cinema), 1999 (as the Regent Theatre)

Website
- Official Website

The Regent Theatre is a theatre in Stoke-on-Trent, England. Constructed in 1929 as a cinema, it is one of several theatres in the city centre and one of two operated by the Ambassador Theatre Group on behalf of Stoke-on-Trent City Council. The building was converted for full-time use as a theatre in 1999, and since then has hosted a number of shows and musicals. The theatre is also the northern base for the Glyndebourne Touring Opera.

== History ==
=== 20th Century ===
The building was originally opened as a cinema, having been commissioned by Provincial Cinematograph Theatres. The Regent was one of a number of "Regents" built across the country by the company, including one in Bournemouth, Brighton and Bristol. The building was designed by William E. Trent and opened in 1929 by the Lord Mayor of Stoke-on-Trent, William Leason. The building was not only designed for cinema use, but for cine-variety with the stage being used in its early years to host stage performances in-between films. A Wurlitzer organ was also installed.

In 1950, The Regent, by this point owned by Gaumont British, was renamed The Gaumont and began to host local amateur dramatic performances following the closure of the nearby Theatre Royal. The Gaumont also hosted live concerts, including performances by Shirley Bassey, Cliff Richard, Stevie Wonder and The Beatles. The building was converted into a three screen cinema and renamed The Gaumont Film Centre in 1974, before being taken over by Odeon in 1976. The success of the venue in the eighties led to the construction of a new eight screen Odeon multiplex in 1989, with the old building closing.

=== Renovation and 21st century ===
By the late 1990s, the building's condition had deteriorated and the interior dome had suffered from extensive water damage. The 'Regent Theatre Trust' was set up to manage the renovation and restoration of the building by a small grouped headed by Richard Talbot, before the council took over the redevelopment as part of its Cultural Quarter scheme. The original stage house and part of the auditorium were demolished, and a new stage, backstage facilities and orchestra pit built. The auditorium was restored, with a new proscenium arch constructed, alongside new front-of-house facilities and full disabled access. Following a three-year, £23 million development, The Regent held a preopening concert performed by The Porthill Players, a local amateur dramatic society and it was then officially reopened on 22 September 1999 with a performance of the national tour of Annie. Elizabeth II officially opened The Regent Theatre in October 1999.

Since reopening in 1999, the theatre has presented numerous national tours: Thoroughly Modern Millie, Cats, Starlight Express, 42nd Street and The Woman in Black. The theatre also hosts an annual pantomime, frequently starring local "celebrity" Jonathan Wilkes.

== Architecture ==
The theatre is built in the Art Deco style. Its frontage is clad in white glazed terracotta, featuring mask representations of comedy and tragedy in each corner.
