= The Grinning Man (musical) =

- Artwork for the West End production
- Music: Tim Phillips; Marc Teitler
- Lyrics: Carl Grose; Tom Morris; Tim Phillips; Marc Teitler
- Book: Carl Grose
- Basis: The Man Who Laughs by Victor Hugo
- Premiere: 20 October 2016: Bristol Old Vic
- Productions: 2016 Bristol; 2017 West End; 2022 Moscow; 2024 Melbourne

The Grinning Man is a tragicomic musical based on Victor Hugo's 1869 novel The Man Who Laughs with a book by Carl Grose, music by Tim Phillips, Marc Teitler and lyrics by Carl Grose, Tom Morris, Tim Phillips and Marc Teitler.

== Production history ==
=== Bristol (2016) ===
The musical made its world premiere at the Bristol Old Vic, beginning previews from 13 October, with a press night on 20 October, for a limited run until 13 November 2016. The production was directed by Tom Morris, set designed by Jon Bausor, costume designed by Jean Chan, movement direction by Jane Gibson, lighting design by Richard Howell, sound design by Simon Baker, with puppetry direction and design by Gyre & Gimble (Finn Caldwell and Toby Olié).

=== London (2017-18) ===
Following the success of the Bristol run, the musical transferred to the Trafalgar Studios (Studio 1) in London's West End beginning previews from 5 December, with a press night on 18 December 2017. The production ended its extended run on 5 May 2018.

During the COVID-19 pandemic, it was announced the Bristol Old Vic would stream an archive recording of the production (featuring the original Bristol cast) on YouTube from 26 June to 3 July 2020.

The playtext was published by Samuel French, Inc. on 5 May 2021.

=== Moscow (2022) ===
On 4 February 2022, an opening reading of the musical took place, the musical made its world premiere in Moscow at the Yauza Palace, beginning previews from 23 September, with opening night on 21 October.

=== Melbourne (2024) ===
On 19 December 2023, it was announced that the production would make its international premiere at Alex Theatres St Kilda, beginning previews from 25 April, with opening night on 2 May. The run is expected to end 19 May. This production combines elements from both the Bristol and West End productions.

== Synopsis ==
=== Act 1 ===
The play opens with a narration by the court clown Barkilphedro as we are introduced to a fictional version of London. He muses about how laughing at the misfortune of others is the biggest joy in life ("Laughter Is The Best Medicine"), before introducing the royal family to the audience: King Clarence with his three children, who are the hedonistic Josiana, the foolish David and Angelica, their miserable half-sister who has been locked away for most of her life.

David wanders around the Trafalgar fair where he meets wrangler Osric who presents him to a group of people with so-called afflictions. David then stumbles upon a caravan owned by Ursus, a puppeteer and druggist touring with his act, consisting of Grinpayne, a young man known as "The Grinning Man" for his facial disfigurement, as well as Dea, a blind young woman who he claims has "gone blind from gazing at him too long". Fascinated, David pays Ursus to continue in the hopes of seeing the man’s deformity.

Many years prior, King Clarence purged the country of rebels and executed those who stood in his way. Those desperate to get away fought to escape by ship, including Ursus. However, Ursus is unsuccessful in boarding the last ship departing and can only spectate as a woman attempts to climb onboard with her son. The captain forces the boy to remove the bandages on his mouth to reveal a hideous grin carved upon it ("Show Us Your Face").

The boy is forced off the vessel as the people on board conclude he is a bad omen. The ship is then struck by a large wave, killing everyone on board, including the boy's mother, which leaves him devastated as he vows to never forget her ("Mother's Song").

Wandering aimlessly through the woods, he discovers an infant girl whose mother has frozen to death and takes her in. As he makes his way past the bodies of the executed rebels, he collapses from exhaustion and awaits death. Just then, an apparition of one of the hanged men appears and encourages the boy to keep going. As the boy rises up, he vows to protect the girl and find whoever disfigured him (“Hymn of The Hanged”).

The children are discovered by Mojo, a wolf-hound who leads him to Ursus’ caravan. After resuscitating the girl, Ursus discovers that she is blind as well as of the boy’s disfigurement and providing him with pain killers. The boy introduces himself as Grinpayne, and demands Ursus help him find his perpetrator. He then begins telling Ursus of what happened, before being overwhelmed and breaking down into tears (“Cry of Pain”). Ursus comforts Grinpayne and convinces him that it’s best for him to let go of the painful memories and forget his past. Ursus decides to adopt the children and raise Grinpayne and the girl, whom he names Dea, as they leave London to start a new life (“Stars in the Sky”).

Ursus starts telling the children stories as a way for them to cope with their tragic pasts and does everything in his power to prevent them from finding out the truth, despite Dea’s insistsance that they must confront the dark truth as it is the only way forward (“Blind to Nothing”). Grinpayne gradually forgets practically everything about his past. Years pass, and Dea and Grinpayne grow up and fall in love with each other (“Beauty and the Beast”).

Back in the present, just as Grinpayne’s face is about to be revealed, the Great Bell of Bermondsey rings, which is later revealed due to King Clarence’s death as they recite the royal motto: “To them that have much more shall be given, to them that have not the little they have shall be taken”. At first it seems that none of the king’s children bother to show up. Barkilphedro has an imaginary conversation with the dead king’s corpse, wishing to be made a lord, but the corpse laughs in his face. Suddenly, Angelica shows up to the funeral. As she is the successor, the bishop has no other choice but to crown her queen, despite pointing out that she is slightly mad. As soon as she’s crowned queen, she immediately makes the decree that all traitors must be brought to justice and those who catch them shall be rewarded handsomely (“Weep oh Weep”).

An exhausted Josiana returns from an orgy, and is immediately confronted by Angelica about her incestuous relationship with David. She asks her to find a husband who isn’t related by blood and to stop David from going to the fair and neglecting his duties, or else she would strip him of his title and take his sword. She proclaims how if she were queen she would outlaw law itself and wishes for someone to love. Just then David bursts in and informs Josiana about Grinpayne’s act and expresses his delight and amusement in seeing the entire thing as they rush to the fair. (“Never Seen a Face like This).

Back at the caravan, Grinpayne and Dea confide to each other that they feel as if they are one step closer to discovering their pasts. Grinpayne asks Dea to help him find whoever mutilated his face and Dea happily promises to do so , before they are interrupted by Ursus (“Something’s about to change”).

== Cast and characters ==
Character	Bristol (2016)	West End (2017)	Moscow (2022)	Melbourne (2024)
Grinpayne	Louis Maskell	Louis Maskell	Pavel Stukalov / Yaroslav Bayarunas / Aleksey Petrov	Maxwell Simon
Osric / Young Grinpayne	N/A	N/A	Pavel Stukalov / Andranik Petrosyan	Matthew Hearne
Barkilphedro	Julian Bleach	Julian Bleach	Ruslan Gerasimenko / Denis Saraikin / Aleksey Petrov	Jennifer Vuletic
Ursus	Sean Kingsley	Sean Kingsley	Andrey Shkoldychenko / Denis Saraikin	Dom Hennequin
Duchess Josiana	Gloria Onitiri	Amanda Wilkin	Galina Bezruk / Galina Shimanskaya / Julia Oleynik	Melanie Bird
Dea	Audrey Brisson	Sanne Den Besten	Vilena Sokolova / Daria Yanvarina	Luisa Scrofani
Young Dea	N/A	N/A	N/A	Lilly Cascun
Osric the Freak-Wrangler of Stokes Croft / Lord Hazlitt Trelaw	Ewan Black	Ewan Black	Pavel Stukalov / Andranik Petrosyan	N/A
Mojo Head / Archbishop Kupsak	Stuart Angell	James Alexander-Taylor	Aleksandr Kazakov / Andrey Shkoldychenko / Andrey Yezhov	N/A
Mojo / Cellist	N/A	N/A	Ruslan Gerasimenko / Andrey Abeltsev	Cameron Bajraktarevic-Hayward
Lord David Dirry-Moir	Stuart Neal	Mark Anderson	Nikita Radchenko / Igor Skripko / Artem Eliseev	Anthony Craig
Queen Angelica	Patrycja Kujawska	Julie Atherton	Anastasiya Makarova / Olga Vecherik	Stephanie Astrid John
King Clarence	Sean Kingsley	Jim Kitson / David Bardsley	Denis Saraikin / Andrey Shkoldychenko	Dom Hennequin
Lady Trelaw / Quake	Gloria Obianyo	Sophia Mackay	Julia Oleynik / Daria Burlyukalo	Shelley Dunlop
Lord Trelaw / Guitarist	N/A	N/A	N/A	Luke Leong-Tay
Mojo Body / Frozen Woman	Alice Barclay	Loren O'Dair	N/A	N/A
Ensemble	N/A	Christina Bloom	Julia Oleynik / Daria Burlyukalo / Kristina Tolmacheva	N/A
Ensemble	N/A	Jonathan Cobb	Aleksandr Kazakov / Andrey Abeltsev	N/A
Ensemble	N/A	Leo Elso	Aleksandr Sharabarin	N/A
Ensemble	N/A	Claire-Marie Hall	Valeriya Morar / Daria Marincheva	N/A

== Song list ==
Act I

- "Grab It By The Horn (Pre Show)" - Hans And The Bleeding Cheeks, Company Musicians
- "Laughter Is The Best Medicine" - Barkilphedro, King Clarence, Josiana, Dirry-Moir, Angelica, Company
- "Show Us Your Face" - Mother, Grinpayne, Company
- "The Mothers Song" - Mother, Grinpayne
- "Hymn Of The Hanged" - Trelaw, Grinpayne
- "Cry Of Pain" - Grinpayne
- "Stars In The Sky" - Ursus
- "Blind To Nothing" - Dea, Ursus, Grinpayne
- "Beauty And The Beast" - Grinpayne, Dea
- "Weep Oh Weep" - Kupsak, Company
- "Somethings Going To Change" - Queen Angelica, Kupsak, Company
- "Never Seen A Face Like This" - Dirry-Moir, Josiana
- "Born Broken" - Dea, Grinpayne, Ursus
- "I Am The Freak Show" - Grinpayne
- "Roll Up!" - Company
- "Josiana's Letter" - Josiana, Grinpayne
- "A Scar Is Born!" - Grinpayne, Company

Act II

- "Labyrinth" - Grinpayne
- "Only a Clown/Give Me Back My Mother (Reprise)" - Barkilphedro, Trelaw, King Clarence, Mother, Grinpayne, Ursus
- "Brand New World Of Feeling" - Grinpayne, Josiana
- "The Smiling Song" - Grinpayne, Company
- "A New Beginning" - Grinpayne, Queen Angelica, Josiana, Dirry-Moir, Company
- "Burn Down The Fair" - Barkilphedro, Quake, Company
- Finale: "The Last Kiss" "Revenge And Mercy" "The Smile In Your Face" "Beauty And The Beast" "New Royal Motto" - Grinpayne, Dea, Josiana, Queen Angelica, Dirry-Moir, Barkilphedro, Mother, Trelaw, Company
- "Stars In The Sky (Reprise)" - Grinpayne, Dea, Ursus, Company

A cast recording was released on 13 July 2018, featuring the Original London Cast, which contained 19 songs from the show, including a bonus track 'Only a Clown', recorded by Julian Bleach.

== Reception ==
The Grinning Man received mostly positive reviews, with The Guardian calling it "a fabulously theatrical conceit" and giving it four out of five stars, and The Stage calling it "unusual yet enticing". However, the Evening Standard gave it two out of five stars, citing the "dismayingly unclear" narrative and "largely unmemorable" music and singing.
