= Milton Keynes Theatre =

Theatre in Milton Keynes, England

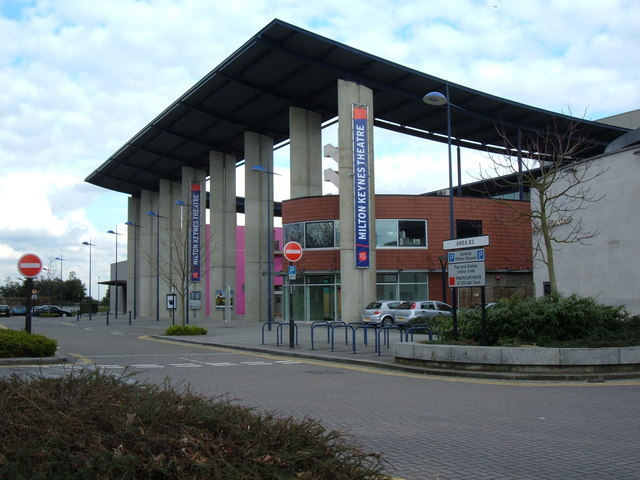
- Interactive map of Milton Keynes Theatre
- Address: Marlborough Gate; Milton Keynes, Buckinghamshire; England
- Coordinates: 52.0441°N 0.7488°W
- Owner: Ambassador Theatre Group
- Capacity: 900 – 1,400
- Production: Touring productions

Construction
- Opened: 1999
- Architects: Blonski-Heard with Kut Nadiadi & Robert Doe

Website
- Milton Keynes Theatre website at Ambassador Theatre Group

Milton Keynes Theatre is a large theatre in Milton Keynes, Buckinghamshire. It opened on 4 October 1999, 25 years after the campaign for a new theatre first started.

Designed by architects Blonski-Heard with Kut Nadiadi and Robert Doe, the theatre design employed the latest building techniques, using some of the most technically advanced equipment available.

The auditorium has been designed to accommodate various shows: the ceiling can be lowered or raised depending on the scale of the production. The seating can also be moved around within the auditorium to vary the capacity from between 900 and 1,400. Consequently, the theatre accommodates a wide range of productions, from large-scale musicals, to smaller, more intimate drama.

The acoustic designers, Arup Acoustics, used a 1:50 scale acoustic model to determine the effect of the moving ceiling on the acoustic.

The programme includes a variety of large and small West End productions and a Christmas pantomime, touring opera and ballet, as well as touring drama.

The theatre is managed and operated by the Ambassador Theatre Group. ATG were appointed as theatre operator in 1998, before the theatre opened.
