= Churchill Theatre =

Theatre in Bromley, London, England

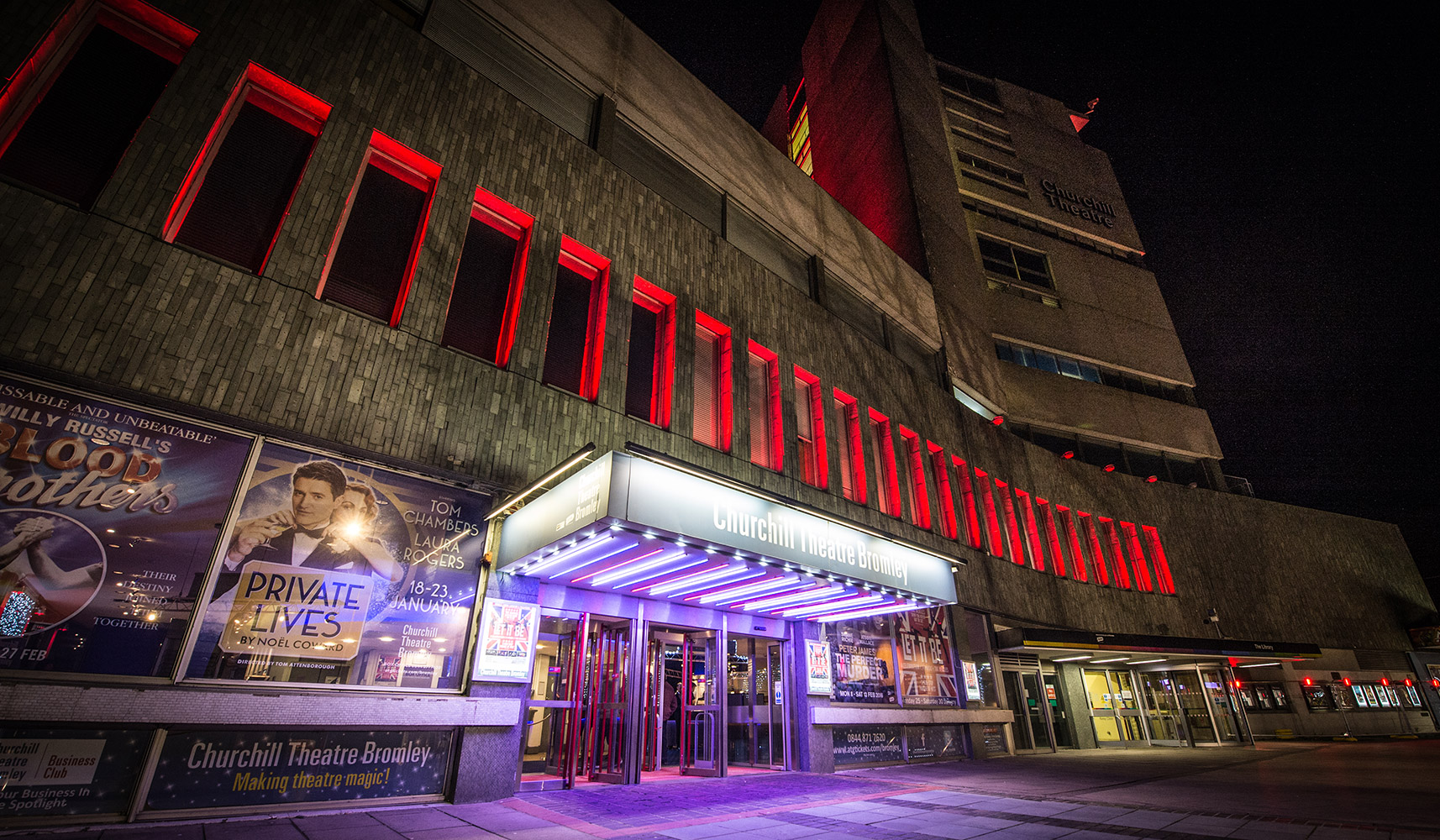
- The Churchill Theatre at Night
- Interactive map of Churchill Theatre
- Address: High Street; Bromley, London; England
- Coordinates: 51.403611°N 0.014444°E
- Operator: Trafalgar Theatres [part of Trafalgar Entertainment Group]
- Capacity: 781 seated
- Type: Visiting performances
- Public transit: Bromley South

Construction
- Opened: 19 July 1977; 49 years ago
- Architect: Ken Wilson

Website
- churchilltheatre.co.uk

The Churchill Theatre in Bromley, southeast London, was built by the London Borough of Bromley according to designs by the borough architect's department. The Churchill is an example of a repertory theatre built in the style of European opera houses, with a large stage and sub-stage workshops. Integrated into the central library complex overlooking Church House Gardens and Library Gardens, it was built on the side of a hill, disguising the number and size of the lower levels and giving the impression of being smaller by setting the auditorium below ground level which is entered by descending staircases from the foyer.

Named after former Prime Minister Winston Churchill, the theatre was inaugurated on 19 July 1977 by the Prince of Wales, and seats 781. It took seven years to build at a cost of £1.63m.

Currently the theatre is operated under a contract held by Trafalgar Entertainment, previous to that HQ Theatres & Hospitality and previous to that Ambassador Theatre Group. In July 2024 Bromley Council advertised the freehold of the theatre as "land for sale". In September 2024 the council announced that, after discussions with Trafalgar Entertainment, an offer for the freehold had been accepted.
