= List of theatres in the United Kingdom =

The following is a list of active professional theatres and concert halls in the United Kingdom. They are organised alphabetically in name order.

== Permanently closed theatres ==
Theatre	Location	Closed	Capacity	Former Management
Courtyard Theatre	Stratford-on-Avon	2010	1,048	Royal Shakespeare Company
Palace Theatre, Swansea	Swansea	2006; under redevelopment since 2021	600+	
Nuffield Theatre	Southampton	2020	450	
Theatre Royal, Exeter	Exeter	1962; demolished		
Cochrane Theatre	London	2012	314	
Cockpit Theatre	London	1665	220	
Empire Theatre (Glasgow)	Glasgow	1963	2,100	
Theatre Royal, Edinburgh	Edinburgh	1946; destroyed by fire		

== 0–9 ==
Theatre	Location	Opened	Capacity	Current Management
1435 Theatre (formerly Pomegranate Theatre)	Chesterfield	1800s (as The Civic Theatre), reopened 2026	625	Owner – Chesterfield Borough Council
53 Two	Manchester	2016 in first space, 2019 into temporary space, 2023 into current space	150	Creative Director – Simon Naylor

== A ==
Theatre	Location	Opened	Capacity	Current Management
Abbey Theatre	Nuneaton	1969	248	Chief Executive – Tony Deeming
Adelphi Theatre	London	1806	1,500	Owners – Nederlander Organization, Really Useful Theatres
Alban Arena	St Albans	June 1968	856–1,200	Operator – 1Life Management Solutions Ltd
Aldwych Theatre	London	1905	1,200	Owner – Nederlander Organization
Alexandra Theatre	Birmingham	27 May 1901	1,347	Owner – Ambassador Theatre Group
Alhambra Theatre	Bradford	1914	1,456	Operator – Bradford Council (Theatres)
Almeida Theatre	London	1980	325	Artistic Director – Rupert Goold
Ambassadors Theatre	London	5 June 1913	444	Owner – Stephen Waley–Cohen
Angles Theatre	Wisbech	c1790	c100	Wisbech Angles Theatre Council
The Anvil	Basingstoke	April 1994	1,400	Owner – The Anvil Trust Ltd
Apollo Theatre	London	21 February 1901	658	Owner – Nimax Theatres
Apollo Victoria Theatre	London	1930	2,328	Owner – Ambassador Theatre Group
Arcola Theatre	London	September 2000	200	Artistic Director – Mehmet Ergen
Arena Theatre	Wolverhampton	1967; refurbished 1999	150	Owner – University of Wolverhampton
Artrix	Bromsgrove	2005	301	Operator – Bromsgrove Arts Centre Trust
Arts Theatre	London	5 June 1913	350	Operator – JJ Goodman Ltd
artsdepot	London	23 October 2004	158–395	Operator – The Arts Depot Trust Limited
Ashcroft Theatre	London	5 November 1962	763	Owner – Croydon London Borough Council

== B ==
Theatre	Location	Opened	Capacity	Current Management
Bacon Theatre	Cheltenham	1991	566	Theatre Manager – Debbie Godber
Barbican Theatre	London	1982	1,156	Artistic Director – Louise Jeffreys
Barons Court Theatre	London	1991	57	Owner – Geronimo Inns (Young & Co.’s Brewery)
Barn Theatre, Circencester	Cirencester	2018	203	Artistic Director – Iwan Lewis
Barn Theatre, Welwyn Garden City	Welwyn Garden City, Hertfordshire	1931	121	Owner – Barn Theatre Trust
Barons Court Theatre	London	1991	57	Owner – Geronimo Inns (Young & Co.’s Brewery)
Bristol Hippodrome	Bristol	1912	1,951	Owner – Ambassador Theatre Group
Beck Theatre	Hayes	1977	600	Owner – HQ Theatres
Bedworth Civic Hall	Bedworth	1973	745	Theatre Manager – Simon Farndon. Owner – Bedworth Civic Hall Charitable Incorporated Organisation
Belgrade Theatre	Coventry	1958	858	Artistic Director – Hamish Glen
Birmingham Hippodrome	Birmingham	1895	1,935	Birmingham Hippodrome Theatre Trust Ltd
Birmingham Repertory Theatre	Birmingham	1913	1,265	Birmingham Rep Enterprises Limited
Blackburn Empire Theatre	Blackburn	October 2002	332	Charity with Volunteer Board
Blackfriars Arts Centre	Boston	27 March 1949	230	
Bloomsbury Theatre	London	1968	547	Owner – University College London
Bolton Little Theatre	Bolton	1931	165	
Bonington	Nottingham	1979	178	Owner – Gedling Borough Council
Boxmoor Playhouse	Hemel Hempstead	1997	200	Owner – Hemel Hempstead Theatre Company
Blue Orange Theatre	Birmingham	April 2011	107	
Brangwyn Hall	Swansea	23 October 1934	1070	
Broadway Theatre, Catford	London	1932	800	
Brockley Jack Theatre	London	1992	50	
Brookside Theatre	Romford	2012	140	
Burnley Mechanics	Burnley	1986	495	Burnley Leisure Trust
Bush Theatre	London	6 April 1972	180	
Buxton Opera House	Buxton	1903	902	Operator – High Peak Theatre Trust

== C ==
Theatre	Location	Opened	Capacity	Current Management
Camberley Theatre	Camberley		408	Owner – Surrey Heath Borough Council
Cambridge Arts Theatre	Cambridge	1 February 1936	666	
Cambridge Corn Exchange	Cambridge	1875	1,849	
Cambridge Theatre	London	4 September 1930	1,231	Owner – Really Useful Theatres
Canal Cafe Theatre	London		60	
Carriageworks Theatre	Leeds	11 November 2005	349	Owner – Leeds City Council
Cast Theatre	Doncaster	2 September 2013	620	Director – Deborah Rees
Castle Theatre	Wellingborough	1995	503	Operator – Parkwood Theatres.
Chelsea Theatre	London	November 2001	110	
Chichester Festival Theatre	Chichester	1962	1,206	Artistic Director – Daniel Evans
Chickenshed Theatre	London	1974	300	Artistic Director – Lou Stein
Churchill Theatre	Bromley	19 July 1977	781	Operator – HQ Theatres
Citizens Theatre	Glasgow	11 September 1878	500	Artistic Director – Dominic Hill
City Hall	Sheffield	22 September 1932	2,271	
Civic Theatre	Rotherham	7 March 1960	356	
Coliseum Theatre (Aberdare)	Aberdare	17 September 1938	600	
Coliseum Theatre	London	1904	2,558	Owner – English National Opera
Congress Theatre	Eastbourne	1963	1,689	Owner – Eastbourne Borough Council
Contact Theatre	Manchester	1972	320	Operator – The Manchester Young People's Theatre Ltd
Corn Exchange, King's Lynn	King's Lynn	1854	733	
Corn Exchange, Newbury	Newbury	1993	400	The Corn Exchange (Newbury) Trust
Court Theatre	Tring, Hertfordshire	1978	220	Operator – Court Theatre Ltd
Courtyard Theatre (Hereford)	Hereford	1998	520	Operator – The Courtyard Trust Ltd
Cottesloe (Royal National Theatre)	London	1976	400	Artistic Director – Rufus Norris
Crescent Theatre	Birmingham	1932	460	
Criterion Theatre (Coventry)	Coventry	1961	122	
Criterion Theatre	London	21 March 1874	588	Owner – Criterion Theatre Trust
Cromer Pier Pavilion Theatre	Cromer, Norfolk	1901	500	Openwide Coastal Ltd
Crucible Theatre	Sheffield	1971	980	Artistic Director – Robert Hastie
Curve	Leicester	11 November 2008	920	Artistic Director – Nikolai Foster
Caird Hall	Dundee	1923	2000	

== D ==
Theatre	Location	Opened	Capacity	Current Management
Darlington Hippodrome	Darlington	1907	1,000	Owner – Darlington County Council
De Montfort Hall	Leicester	1913	2,000	Owner – Leicester City Council
Derby Theatre	Derby	1975	535	Artistic Director – Sarah Brigham
Dominion Theatre	London	October 1929	2,163	Owner – Nederlander Organization
Little Theatre	Doncaster		99	
Donmar Warehouse	London	18 July 1977	271	Artistic Director – Josie Rourke
Dorking Halls	Surrey	1931	813	
Duchess Theatre	London	25 November 1929	494	Owner – Nimax Theatres
Duke of York's Theatre	London	10 September 1892	640 (900 originally)	Owner – Ambassador Theatre Group
Dundee Rep Theatre	Dundee	May 1939	455	

== E ==
Theatre	Location	Opened	Capacity	Current Management
Edinburgh Festival Theatre	Edinburgh	November 7, 1892	1,915	Operator – Capital Theatres
Edinburgh Playhouse	Edinburgh	1929	3,059	Owner – Ambassador Theatre Group
Empire Theatre (Hackney)	Hackney	1901; rebuilt in 2004	1,275	
Empire Theatre (Liverpool)	Liverpool	March 9, 1925	2,348	Owner – Ambassador Theatre Group
Empire Theatre (Sunderland)	Sunderland	July 1, 1907	2,200	Operator – Ambassador Theatre Group
Epsom Playhouse	Surrey	1984	406	
Epstein Theatre	Liverpool	1913	380	Owner – Liverpool City Council
Everyman Theatre, Cheltenham	Cheltenham	October 1891	694	Chief Executive – Mark Goucher
Everyman Theatre (Liverpool)	Liverpool	1964; rebuilt in 2011–14	400	Liverpool and Merseyside Theatres Trust Ltd

== F ==
Theatre	Location	Opened	Capacity	Current Management
Finborough Theatre	London	June 1980	50	Artistic Director – Neil McPherson
The Fisher Theatre	Bungay	February 1828	115–160	Bungay Arts and Theatre Society
Floral Pavilion Theatre	Wirral	December 2008	814	Wirral Council
Fortune Theatre	London	November 8, 1924	432	Owner – Ambassador Theatre Group
The Forum	Barrow-in-Furness	1990	580	
The Forum Open-air Theatre	Norwich	October 2001	variable	
The Forum Studio Theatre	Chester	1998	100	
The Frazer Theatre	Knaresborough	1968	127	
Futurist Theatre	Scarborough	1967	2,155	

== G ==
Theatre	Location	Opened	Capacity	Current Management
G Live	Guildford	September 2011	1031	Owner – HQ Theatres
Garrick Theatre	London	24 April 1889	718 (current); 800 (original)	Owner – Nimax Theatres
Gatehouse Theatre	Stafford		535	Freedom Leisure
Gate Theatre (London)	London	1979	75	Artistic Director – Ellen McDougall
Georgian Theatre Royal	Richmond, Yorkshire	1788; rebuilt 1963	214	
Gielgud Theatre	London	27 December 1906	986	Owner – Delfont Mackintosh Theatres
Gillian Lynne Theatre	London	02 January 1973	1294	Owner – LW Theatres
Globe Theatre	London	1599; rebuilt 1997	1,400 (current); 3,000 (original)	Artistic Director – Michelle Terry
Gordon Craig Theatre	Stevenage	1976	1,701	
Grand Opera House (Belfast)	Belfast	23 December 1895; reopened 1980	1,063	
Grand Opera House (York)	York	20 January 1902	1028	Operator – Ambassador Theatre Group
Grand Pavilion	Porthcawl	1932	643	
Grand Theatre, Blackpool	Blackpool	1894; reopened 23 March 1981	1,100	Owner – Blackpool Grand Theatre Trust Ltd
Grand Theatre, Lancaster	Lancaster	1792; 1978	457	
Greenwich Theatre	Greenwich	1864, rebuilt 1969	430	
The Grand	Clitheroe	1874; 2008	400 (standing); 240 (fully seated, theatre–style); 140 (cabaret)	Owned by The Lancaster Foundation
Grand Theatre, Leeds	Leeds	18 November 1878	1,550	Home of Opera North
Grand Theatre, Swansea	Swansea	1897	1,014	
Grand Theatre, Wolverhampton	Wolverhampton	1894; rebuilt in 1982	1,200	
Grimsby Auditorium	Grimsby	1995	1,200–2,000	
Guildhall of St George	King's Lynn	1445	320	Shakespear's Guildhall Trust

== H ==
Theatre	Location	Opened	Capacity	Current Management
Hall for Cornwall	Truro	1846	969	
Hall Green Little Theatre	Birmingham	1951	180	Hall Green Little Theatre Ltd
Harlow Playhouse	Harlow	1971	409	Harlow District Council – Artistic Director – Rory Davies
Harrogate Theatre	Harrogate	1900	500	Managed by Harrogate (White Rose) Theatre Trust Ltd
Harold Pinter Theatre	London	15 October 1881	796 (1,180 originally)	Owner – Ambassador Theatre Group
Haymarket Theatre	Basingstoke	1951; refurbished 2007	380	
Her Majesty's Theatre	London	1705	1,216	Owner – Really Useful Group
The Hexagon	Reading	1977	1,686	
Highbury Theatre	Birmingham	1942	140	Highbury Theatre Centre Ltd
Hope Mill Theatre	Manchester	2015	145	William Whelton – Executive Director, Joseph Houston – Artistic Director
Hull New Theatre	Hull	1939	1,330	Hull Culture & Leisure
Hull City Hall	Hull	1909	1200 – 1800	Hull Culture & Leisure
Hull Truck Theatre	Hull	1971	435	Artistic Director – Mark Babych

== I ==
Theatre	Location	Opened	Capacity	Current Management
Incognito Theatre	London	1938	65	The Incognito Theatre Group

J

Theatre	Location	Opened	Capacity	Current Management
Jacksons Lane	London	1975	166	Executive Director – Isobel Smith
Jigsaw Youth Theatre	Halesowen, Dudley	2017		Jigsaw Youth Theatre

== K ==
Theatre	Location	Opened	Capacity	Current Management
Key Theatre, Peterborough	Peterborough	1973	360	Landmark Theatres (part of Selladoor Worldwide)
King's Hall	Herne Bay, Kent	4 April 1904	250–500	
King's Theatre, Newmarket	Newmarket	1955	123	Newmarket Operatic Musical And Dramatic Society Ltd (NOMADS)
Kings Theatre, Southsea	Portsmouth/Southsea	30 September 1907	1,600	

== L ==
Theatre	Location	Opened	Capacity	Current Management
Lace Market Theatre	Nottingham	1972	118	
Lakeside Theatre (University of Essex)	Colchester, Essex	1971	200	
Lamproom Theatre	Barnsley	1999	187	Barnsley Theatre Trust
Lantern Theatre	Liverpool	2009	85	
Lantern Theatre	Sheffield	1893	84	
Lawrence Batley Theatre	Huddersfield	9 July 1819	477	
Leatherhead Theatre (formerly Thorndike Theatre)	Leatherhead, Surrey	1969	498	
Leeds City Varieties	Leeds	1865; reopened September 2011	467	
Leeds Playhouse	Leeds	March 1990	1,100	
Leighton Buzzard Library Theatre	Leighton Buzzard	October 5, 1979	170	
Library Theatre (Manchester)	Manchester	17 July 1934; reopened 22 March 2014	312	
Library Theatre (Sheffield)	Sheffield	1947	260	
Lichfield Garrick Theatre & Studio	Lichfield, Staffordshire	2003	562	
Lighthouse (Poole)	Poole	1978	1,500 (Concert Hall); 669 (Theatre); 130 (Studio)	
Little Theatre (Chester)	Chester	1962	126	
Little Theatre (Leicester)	Leicester	1932	349	
Live Theatre	Newcastle upon Tyne	1982	170	
Liverpool Playhouse	Liverpool	1866	677	Liverpool and Merseyside Theatres Trust Ltd
Liverpool Actors Studio Theatre	Liverpool	1999	80	
London Coliseum	London	1904	2,558	
London Palladium	London	26 December 1910	2,286	
Lowry	Salford	12 October 2000	2,196	
Lyceum Theatre (Crewe)	Crewe, Cheshire	21 November 1887; rebuilt 6 October 1911	1,250 (original); 850 (currently)	
Lyceum Theatre, London	London	14 July 1834	2,100	
Lyceum Theatre (Sheffield)	Sheffield	1897; rebuilt 1991	1,068	
Lyric Theatre (Belfast)	Belfast	1951; reopened 1 May 2011	400	
Lyric Theatre, London	London	17 December 1888	915 (currently); 1,258 (original)	
Lyric Theatre (Lowry)	Salford	12 October 2000	1,730	
Lyric Hammersmith	London	1895	550	
Lyttelton (Royal National Theatre)	London	1976	890	

== M ==
Theatre	Location	Opened	Capacity	Current Management
Macready Theatre	Rugby	1975	250	
Maddermarket Theatre	Norwich	1921	310	
Malvern Festival Theatre	Malvern, Worcestershire	188; reopened 1998	850	Malvern Theatres Trust
Marina Theatre	Lowestoft Suffolk	1878; reopened October 1988	800	
Market Theatre	Ledbury, Herefordshire	1956	128	
Marlowe Theatre	Canterbury	Reopened 2011	1,200	
Mart Theatre	Skipton	2003	300	
Mayflower Theatre	Southampton	December 1928	2,300	
Menier Chocolate Factory	London	2004	180	
Mercury Theatre	Colchester	1972	598	
Merlin Theatre	Sheffield	1974	240	
Met Theatre	Bury	1980	400	
Michael Pilch Studio	Oxford	1997	50–90	Balliol College
Middlesbrough Theatre	Middlesbrough	October 1957	484	Middlesbrough Council
Minack Theatre	Cornwall	1930	750	
Montgomery Theatre	Sheffield	1886	418	
Mull Theatre	Tobermory, Isle of Mull	2008	64	An Tobar and Mull Theatre

== N ==
Theatre	Location	Opened	Capacity	Current Management
Newbridge Memo	Newbridge	1924	446	
New Diorama Theatre	London	2010	80	Artistic Director – Bec Martin
New London Theatre	London	2 January 1973	1,118	
New Theatre (Cardiff)	Cardiff	10 December 1906	1,144	Operator – HQ Theatres and Hospitality
New Theatre Oxford	Oxford	26 February 1934	1,800	
New Theatre, Peterborough	Peterborough	2001; reopened 2017	1079	Landmark Theatres (part of Selladoor Worldwide)
New Vic Theatre	Newcastle-under-Lyme	1986	600	
New Victoria Theatre	Woking	June 1992	1,300	
New Wolsey Theatre	Ipswich, Suffolk	1979	400	
New Wimbledon Theatre	Wimbledon, London	26 December 1910	1,670	
Noël Coward Theatre	London	1903	872	Operator – Delfont Mackintosh Theatres
Norbury Theatre	Droitwich, Worcestershire	1962	176	
Norwich Playhouse	Norwich	1995	300	
Norwich Puppet Theatre	Norwich	1980	140	
Nottingham Playhouse	Nottingham	1963	770	
Nottingham Arts Theatre	Nottingham	1953	321	
Novello Theatre	London	22 May 1905	1,105	
Northcott Theatre	Exeter	1967	464	

== O ==
Theatre	Location	Opened	Capacity	Current Management
Octagon Theatre	Bolton	27 November 1967	300–400	
Old Joint Stock Theatre	Birmingham	1864	95	
The Old Town Hall	Hemel Hempstead	1978	110	Dacorum Borough Council
Old Rep (formerly the Birmingham Repertory Theatre)	Birmingham	15 February 1913	383	
Old Vic	London	1818	1,067	Artistic Director – Matthew Warchus
Oldham Coliseum Theatre	Oldham	1885	585	
Olivier (Royal National Theatre)	London	1976	1,160	
Open Air Theatre, Regent's Park	Regent's Park, London	1932	1,200+	Artistic Director – Timothy Sheader
Opera House (Blackpool)	Blackpool	1889; rebuilt in 1910 and 1939	2,920	
Opera House (Manchester)	Manchester	1912	1,920	
Oxford Playhouse	Oxford	1923	640	

== P ==
Theatre	Location	Opened	Capacity	Current Management
Palace Theatre, Kilmarnock	Kilmarnock	1860	498	
Palace Theatre, London	London	January 1891	1,400	
Palace Theatre, Manchester	Manchester	18 May 1891	1,955	
Palace Theatre, Mansfield	Mansfield	1910	534	
Palace Theatre, Newark	Newark-on-Trent	1920	638	Newark and Sherwood District Council
Palace Theatre, Redditch	Redditch	1913	420	Redditch Borough Council
Palace Theatre, Watford	Watford	14 December 1908	600	
Palace Theatre, Westcliff–on–Sea	Westcliff-on-Sea	21 October 1912	603 (current); 1,500 (original)	
Parc and Dare Hall	Treorchy	1913	660	
Pavilion Theatre (Bournemouth)	Bournemouth	19 March 1929	1,448	
Pavilion Theatre and Bandstand (Gorleston)	Gorleston, Norfolk	8 July 1901	300	
Pavilion Theatre (Rhyl)	Rhyl	1891	1,061	
Pavilion Theatre (Weymouth)	Weymouth	21 December 1908	988	
Peacock Theatre	London	13 November 1911	999 (current); 2,600 (original)	
Peepul Centre	Leicester	2005	314	
Pendle Hippodrome Theatre	Colne	21 September 1914	489	
Penistone Paramount Cinema	Penistone	1914	344	Penistone Town Council
Phoenix Theatre (London)	London	24 September 1930	1,012	
Phoenix Theatre (Ross-on-Wye)	Ross-on-Wye, Herefordshire	1983	64	The Phoenix Theatre Company
Piccadilly Theatre	London	27 April 1928	1,282 (current); 1,400 (original)	
Pitlochry Festival Theatre	Perthshire	19 May 1951	544	
Platform Theatre	Norwich			City College Norwich
Playbox Theatre	Warwick	1999	250	Playbox Theatre Company
Players Theatre	Lowestoft	2012	200	The Lowestoft Players Ltd
Playhouse (Chesterfield)	Hasland, Chesterfield	1944	100	Hasland Theatre Company
Playhouse (Sleaford)	Sleaford	1825	120	Sleaford Little Theatre CIO
Playhouse Theatre	London	11 March 1882	786	
Pleasance Islington	London	1995	230	Pleasance Theatre Trust
Plowright Theatre	Scunthorpe	1958	354	
Polka Theatre	Wimbledon, London	20 November 1979	370	
Prince Edward Theatre	London	3 April 1930	1,716	Owner – Delfont Mackintosh Theatres
Prince of Wales Theatre	London	January 1884	1,160	Owner – Delfont Mackintosh Theatres
Princes Hall	Aldershot	1972	690	
Princes Theatre	Clacton	14 April 1931	1,400	Owner – Tendring District Council
Priory Theatre	Kenilworth	8 April 1946	120	
Proteus Creation Space	Basingstoke, Hampshire	2014 (previously Fairfields Arts Centre)	50	

== Q ==
Theatre	Location	Opened	Capacity	Current Management
Quays Theatre (Lowry)	Salford	12 October 2000	466	
Queen's Theatre	Hornchurch	21 September 1953	507	

== R ==
Theatre	Location	Opened	Capacity	Current Management
Regent	Christchurch, Dorset	1931 (as cinema); 1983	505	
Regent Theatre	Ipswich	1929	1,551	
Regent Theatre, Stoke-on-Trent	Stoke-on-Trent	1999	1,600	Ambassador Theatre Group
Richmond Theatre	London Borough of Richmond	18 September 1899	840	
Riverfront Arts Centre	Newport	23 October 2004	482	
Roses Theatre	Tewkesbury	30 October 1975	375	
Rose Theatre	Kingston upon Thames	16 January 2008	822	
Rose Theatre	Kidderminster	October 1981	181	
Royal & Derngate	Northampton	October 2006	1,783	
Royal Court Theatre (Liverpool)	Liverpool	17 October 1938	1,186	
Royal Court Theatre (London)	London	1870	465	
Royal Exchange Theatre	Manchester	1976	700	
Royal Festival Hall	London	3 May 1951	2,500	
Royal Hall	Harrogate	1903; reopened 2008	950	Harrogate (White Rose) Theatre Trust Ltd
Royal Lyceum Theatre	Edinburgh	10 September 1883	658	
Royal National Theatre	London	22 October 1963	1160 / 890 / 400	
Royal Opera House	London	7 December 1732	2,256	
Royal Spa Centre	Leamington Spa	15 June 1972	667	
Rose Theatre	Rugeley, Staffordshire		210	Rugeley Town Council

== S ==
Theatre	Location	Opened	Capacity	Current Management
Sadler's Wells	London	1683	1,560	
Salisbury Playhouse	Wiltshire	1976	517	Owner – Wiltshire Creative
Savoy Theatre	London	10 October 1881	1,150	Owner – Ambassador Theatre Group
Seagull Theatre	Lowestoft		147	Karen Read
Secombe Theatre	London	1984	343–396	
Scarborough Open Air Theatre	Scarborough	1932; reopened 20 May 2010	6,500	
Sewell Barn Theatre	Norwich	1980	100	
Sondheim Theatre (formerly Queen's Theatre)	London	8 October 1907	1137	Delfont Mackintosh Theatres
Sherman Theatre	Cardiff	1973	452	Sherman Cymru
Shoebox Theatre	Swindon	2017	50	Wrong Shoes Theatre Company
Sinden Theatre	Tenterden, Kent	2004	290	Homewood School
Stanley & Audrey Burton Theatre	Leeds	2010	230	Owner – Northern Ballet & Phoenix Dance Theatre
The Spa Theatre	Bridlington	1907	675	East Riding of Yorkshire Council
The Spa Pavilion	Felixstowe	1909	884	
St David's Hall	Cardiff	30 August 1982	2,000	
St George's Hall	Bradford	29 August 1853	1,500 (current); 3,500 (original)	
St Helen's Theatre Royal	St. Helens	1895, rebuilt 1901	700	Operator – Regal Entertainments Ltd
St. Martin's Theatre	London	26 November 1916	550	
Stables Theatre	Hastings	16 June 1959	126	The Stables Trust
Stephen Joseph Theatre	Scarborough	30 April 1996	404	Artistic Director – Alan Ayckbourn
Storyhouse	Chester	May 2017	500 (Thrust), 800 (Touring)	
Sue Townsend Theatre (formerly Phoenix Arts Centre, then Upper Brown Street)	Leicester	1963	266	
Summerhall Anatomy Theatre	Edinburgh	2011	70	
Summerhall Cairns Theatre	Edinburgh	2011	120	
Summerhall Demonstration Theatre	Edinburgh	2011	60	
Summerhall Dissection Room Theatre	Edinburgh	2011	350	
Summerhall Main Hall Theatre	Edinburgh	2011	200	
Summerhall Red Lecture Theatre	Edinburgh	2011	90	
Sutton Arts Theatre	Sutton Coldfield, Birmingham	1946	129	
Swan Theatre (High Wycombe)	High Wycombe	November 1992	1,076	
Swan Theatre (Stratford)	Stratford-on-Avon	1986	450	
Swan Theatre (Worcester)	Worcester	1965	352	Artistic Director – Sarah-Jane Morgan

== T ==
Theatre	Location	Opened	Capacity	Current Management
Tanya Moiseiwitsch Playhouse (formerly Studio Theatre)	Sheffield	1971	400	
Telford Theatre	Telford	1968	660	Telford and Wrekin Council
The Apex	Bury St. Edmunds	2010	500	West Suffolk Council
Theatre 118	Glasgow	2025	50	Artistic Director – David Hewitson
Theatre by the Lake	Keswick, Cumbria	1999	400	
Theatre of Small Convenience	Malvern, Worcestershire	November 1999; closed 25 February 2017; reopened 2024	12	
Theatre Royal, Bath	Bath	1805	888	
Theatre Royal, Brighton	Brighton	27 June 1807	952	
Theatre Royal, Bury St Edmunds	Bury St. Edmunds	11 October 1819	360	
Theatre Royal, Dumfries	Dumfries	29 September 1792	500–600	
Theatre Royal, Drury Lane	Drury Lane, London	1660	2,196	Owner – Really Useful Theatres
Theatre Royal, Glasgow	Glasgow	1867	1,541	
Theatre Royal, Haymarket	Haymarket, London	4 July 1821	888	Owner – Leonard Blavatnik
Theatre Royal, Lincoln	Lincoln	1893	475	
Theatre Royal, Newcastle	Newcastle upon Tyne	20 February 1837	1,249	
Theatre Royal, Norwich	Norwich	1758	1,308	
Theatre Royal, Nottingham	Nottingham	1856	1,186	
Theatre Royal, Plymouth	Plymouth	5 May 1982	1,320	
Theatre Royal, Stratford East	Stratford, London	17 December 1884	460	
Theatre Royal, Wakefield	Wakefield	1894	499	
Theatre Royal, Winchester	Winchester	1 November 1978	400	
Theatre Royal, Windsor	Windsor	1930	633	Operator – Bill Kenwright
Theatre Royal, York	York	1744	847	Artistic Director – Damian Cruden
Theatreship	London	2024	90–280	Directors – Inigo Lapwood, Natalie Hill
Torch Theatre	Milford Haven	1977	399	
Town Hall	Birmingham	1834; reopened 2007	1086	
Trafalgar Studios	London	29 September 1930	480	Owner – Trafalgar Entertainment Group
Traverse Theatre	Edinburgh	1963	356	Artistic Director – Orla O'Loughlin
Trestle Theatre	St. Albans	1981	125	Executive Director – Clare Winter; Creative Director – Helen Barnett
Trinity Theatre	Tunbridge Wells	1982	279	
Tyne Theatre & Opera House	Newcastle	1867	Originally 3,000; currently 1,347	

== U ==
Theatre	Location	Opened	Capacity	Current Management
Unity Theatre	Liverpool	1980	150	
Usher Hall	Edinburgh	16 March 1914	2,200	

== V ==
Theatre	Location	Opened	Capacity	Current Management
Vaudeville Theatre	London	16 April 1870	690	Owner – Nimax Theatres
Venue Cymru	Llandudno	1982; renovated in 1994 and 2005	1,450 (Theatre); 2,500 (Arena)	
Victoria Palace Theatre	London	6 November 1911	1,550	Owner – Delfont Mackintosh Theatres
Victoria Theatre	Halifax	8 February 1901	1,501	
Valley Community Theatre	Liverpool	1994	150 (seated)	

== W ==
Theatre	Location	Opened	Capacity	Current Management
Wales Millennium Centre	Cardiff	26–28 November 2004 (Phase 1); 22 January 2009 (Phase 2)	1,897	
Warwick Arts Centre	Coventry	1976; renovated 2017–22	1,340 (Butterworth Hall); 550 (Theatre); 150 (Studio)	University of Warwick
Watermill Theatre	Bagnor, Berkshire	1967	220	
Watersmeet Theatre	Rickmansworth	1975	515	Owner – Three Rivers District Council
West Cliff Theatre	Clacton-on-Sea	1894	600	Owner – West Cliff (Tendring) Trust
West End Centre	Aldershot	1975	106	
West Midlands Creation Centre	Birmingham		80	RoguePlay Theatre
Whiffler Theatre	Norwich	1882	110 outdoor	Gifted to Norwich Council Eastern Daily Press Newspaper Group
Whitehall Theatre	Dundee	1890s (Alhambra); 1940–1968 (State Cinema); 1969 became Whitehall Theatre	650	Council owned 1969–1982; Operator – Dundee Whitehall Theatre Company Limited
WInding Wheel Theatre	Chesterfield	1930s (Cinema)	850	Operator – Chesterfield Borough Council
Wolverhampton Civic Hall	Wolverhampton	16 May 1938	3,000	
Wyndham's Theatre	London	16 November 1899	759	Operator – Delfont Mackintosh Theatres
Wyvern Theatre	Swindon	7 September 1971	635	Operator – HQ Theatures

== Y ==
Theatre	Location	Opened	Capacity	Current Management
The Y Theatre	Leicester	1900	300	Owner – Leicester YMCA
York Theatre Royal	York	1744	847	Artistic Director – Damian Cruden
Young Vic	London	11 September 1970	420	Artistic Director – Kwame Kwei–Armah
Yvonne Arnaud Theatre	Guildford	1963	586	Operator – Yvonne Arnaud Theatre Management Limited

== Z ==
Theatre	Location	Opened	Capacity	Current Management
Z-arts	Manchester	2000	222	Operator – Zion Arts Centre Limited
