= West End theatre =

Professional theatre staged in London, England

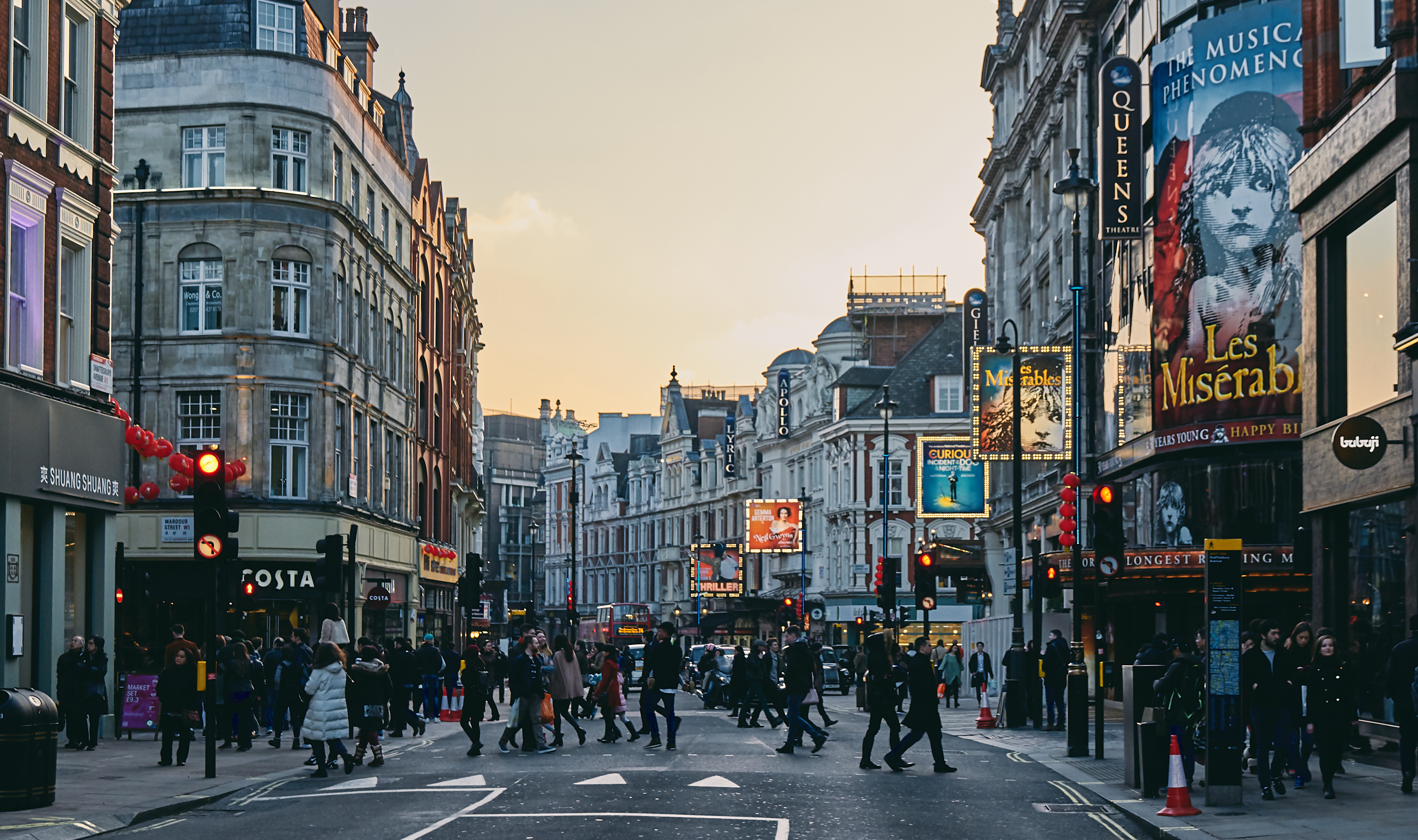
West End theatres on Shaftesbury Avenue

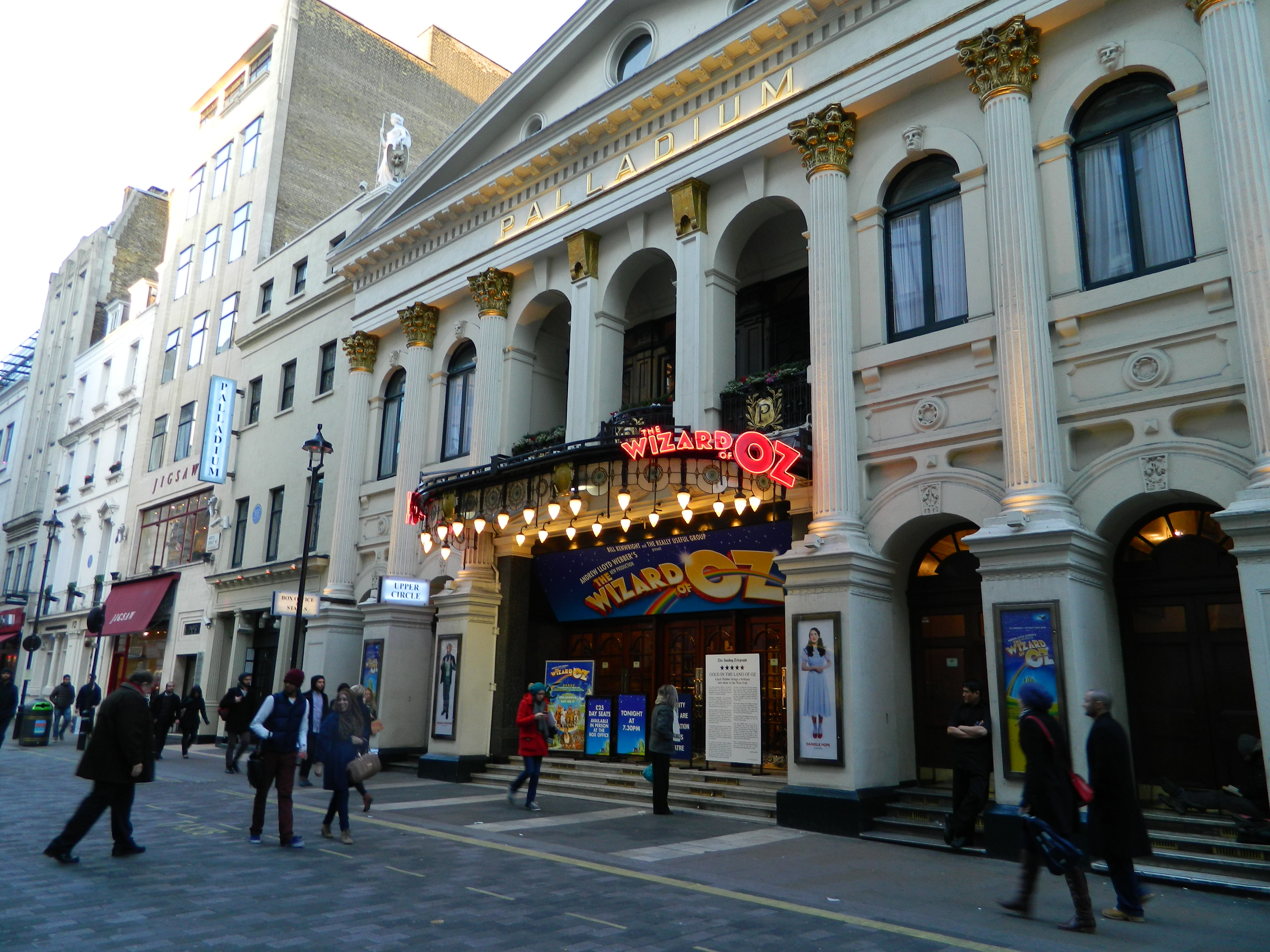
The London Palladium opened in 1910. While the Theatre has a resident show, it also has one-off performances such as concerts. Since 1930 it has often hosted the Royal Variety Performance.

West End theatre is mainstream professional theatre staged in the large theatres in and near the West End of London. West End theatre represents the highest level of commercial theatre in the United Kingdom and, along with New York City's Broadway theatre, the highest level of commercial theatre in the English-speaking world. Seeing a West End show is a common tourist activity in London. Prominent screen actors, British and international alike, frequently appear on the London stage. (Note: Attributed to multiple sources.)

There are about 40 theatres in the West End. The Theatre Royal, Drury Lane, opened in 1663, is the oldest theatre in London. The Savoy Theatre—built as a showcase for the popular series of comic operas of Gilbert and Sullivan—was entirely lit by electricity in 1881.

The Society of London Theatre (SOLT) announced that 2018 was a record year for the capital's theatre industry: attendances topped 15.5 million for the first time since the organisation began collecting audience data in 1986. Box office revenues exceeded £765 million. Attendance slipped 1.4% the next year, but box office revenues reached a record £799 million. In 2023, audiences reached a record 17.1 million. Most West End theatres are owned by the ATG Entertainment, Delfont Mackintosh Theatres, Nimax Theatres, LW Theatres, and the Nederlander Organization.

The Laurence Olivier Awards presented annually to individuals involved in West End and other leading non-commercial productions are widely recognised as the highest honour in professional London theatre.

== History ==
Theatre in London flourished after the English Reformation. The first permanent public playhouse, known as The Theatre, was constructed in 1576 in Shoreditch by James Burbage. It was soon joined by The Curtain. Both are known to have been used by William Shakespeare's company. In 1599, the timber from The Theatre was moved to Southwark, where it was used to build the Globe Theatre in a new theatre district beyond the controls of the City corporation.

The Puritans, who regarded theatre as sinful, closed them in 1642. On 24 January 1643, actors protested the ban by writing a pamphlet, "The Actors remonstrance or complaint for the silencing of their profession, and banishment from their severall play-houses".

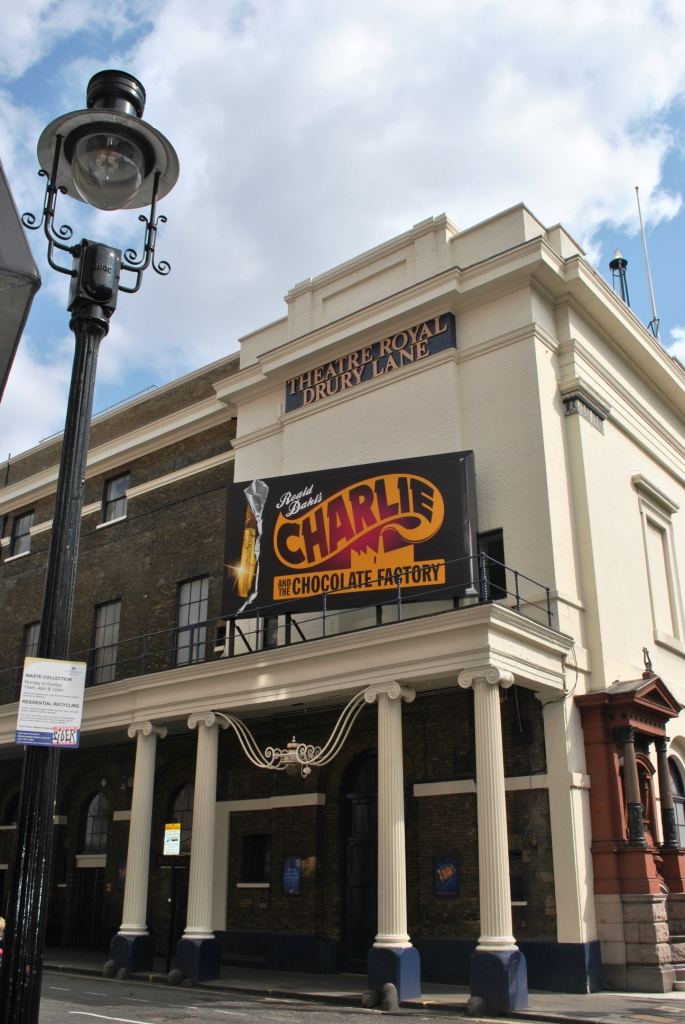
Theatre Royal, Drury Lane. Opened in May 1663, it is the oldest theatre in London.

After the Restoration (1660), Puritan legislation was declared null and void, and theatre (among other arts) exploded. Two companies were licensed to perform: the Duke's Company and the King's Company. Performances were held in converted buildings, such as Lisle's Tennis Court. The first West End theatre, known as Theatre Royal in Bridges Street, was designed by Thomas Killigrew and built on the site of the present Theatre Royal, Drury Lane. It opened on 7 May 1663 and was destroyed by a fire nine years later. It was replaced by a new structure designed by Christopher Wren and renamed the Theatre Royal, Drury Lane. One of the first actresses on the stage, Nell Gwyn, became a star of Restoration comedy.

Outside the West End, Sadler's Wells Theatre opened in Islington on 3 June 1683. Taking its name from founder Richard Sadler and monastic springs that were discovered on the property, it operated as a "Musick House", with performances of opera; as it was not licensed for plays. In the West End, the Theatre Royal Haymarket opened on 29 December 1720 on a site slightly north of its current location, and the Royal Opera House opened in Covent Garden on 7 December 1732. John Gay's ballad opera The Beggar's Opera ran for 62 performances in 1728, and held the record for London's longest run for nearly a century. It has been called "the most popular play of the eighteenth century." Another musical show, Tom and Jerry, or Life in London (1821), was the first London production to reach 100 consecutive performances. Tom and Jerry's combination of a tour of London interspersed with song and dance, gave rise to numerous similar, loosely constructed entertainments, and "planted the seeds for later musical comedy and revue". In 1823, Presumption; or, the Fate of Frankenstein, the first adaptation of Mary Shelley's Frankenstein, was staged at the English Opera House (renamed the Lyceum Theatre in 1834) by Richard Brinsley Peake, who also introduced the line "It lives!". Shelley attended a performance on 29 August 1823 and following the success of the play she wrote, "lo & behold! I found myself famous!".

The patent theatre companies retained their duopoly on drama well into the 19th century, and all other theatres could perform only musical entertainments. By the early 19th century, however, music hall entertainments became popular, and presenters found a loophole in the restrictions on non-patent theatres in the genre of melodrama. According to the British Library, "Unlicensed premises relied on silent or musically-accompanied action, physical theatre, animals and acrobatics, and thus both melodrama and the Victorian pantomime were developed." Initially, these entertainments were presented in large halls, attached to public houses, but purpose-built theatres began to appear in the East End, such as the Pavilion Theatre in Whitechapel. The comic theatrical genre the harlequinade was also popular among London audiences. Its most famous performer, Joseph Grimaldi, best known for developing the white-face clown, made his stage debut at Drury Lane in 1780. He won acclaim for his performance in the pantomime version of Robinson Crusoe by Daniel Defoe at the same theatre in 1796.

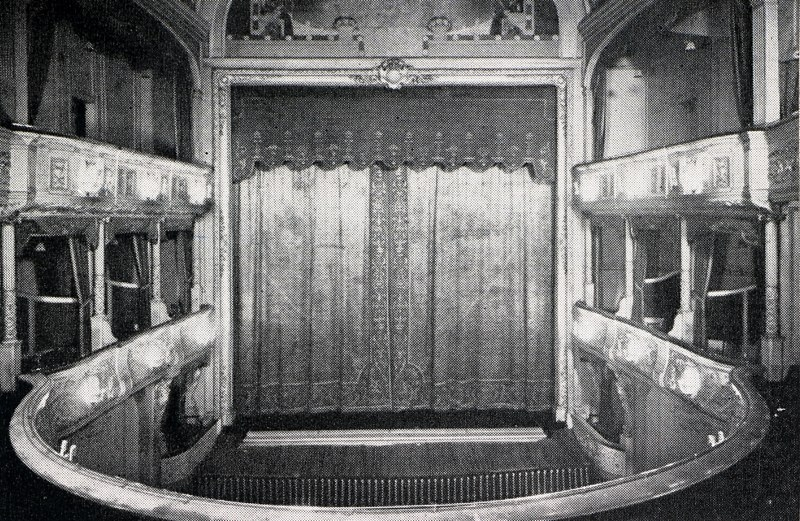
Original interior of Savoy Theatre in 1881, the year it was fitted with the incandescent light bulb developed by Sir Joseph Swan to become the first public building in the world to be lit entirely by electricity.

The West End theatre district became established with the opening of many small theatres and halls, including the Adelphi in The Strand on 17 November 1806. South of the River Thames, the Old Vic, Waterloo Road, opened on 11 May 1818. The expansion of the West End theatre district gained pace with the Theatres Act 1843, which relaxed the conditions for the performance of plays, and The Strand gained another venue when the Vaudeville opened on 16 April 1870. The next few decades saw the opening of many new theatres in the West End. The Adelphi hosted A Christmas Carol; or, Past, Present, and Future in 1844, a play adapted from the novella A Christmas Carol by Charles Dickens—who came to several stage rehearsals during which he made suggestions—with his book published weeks earlier in December 1843.

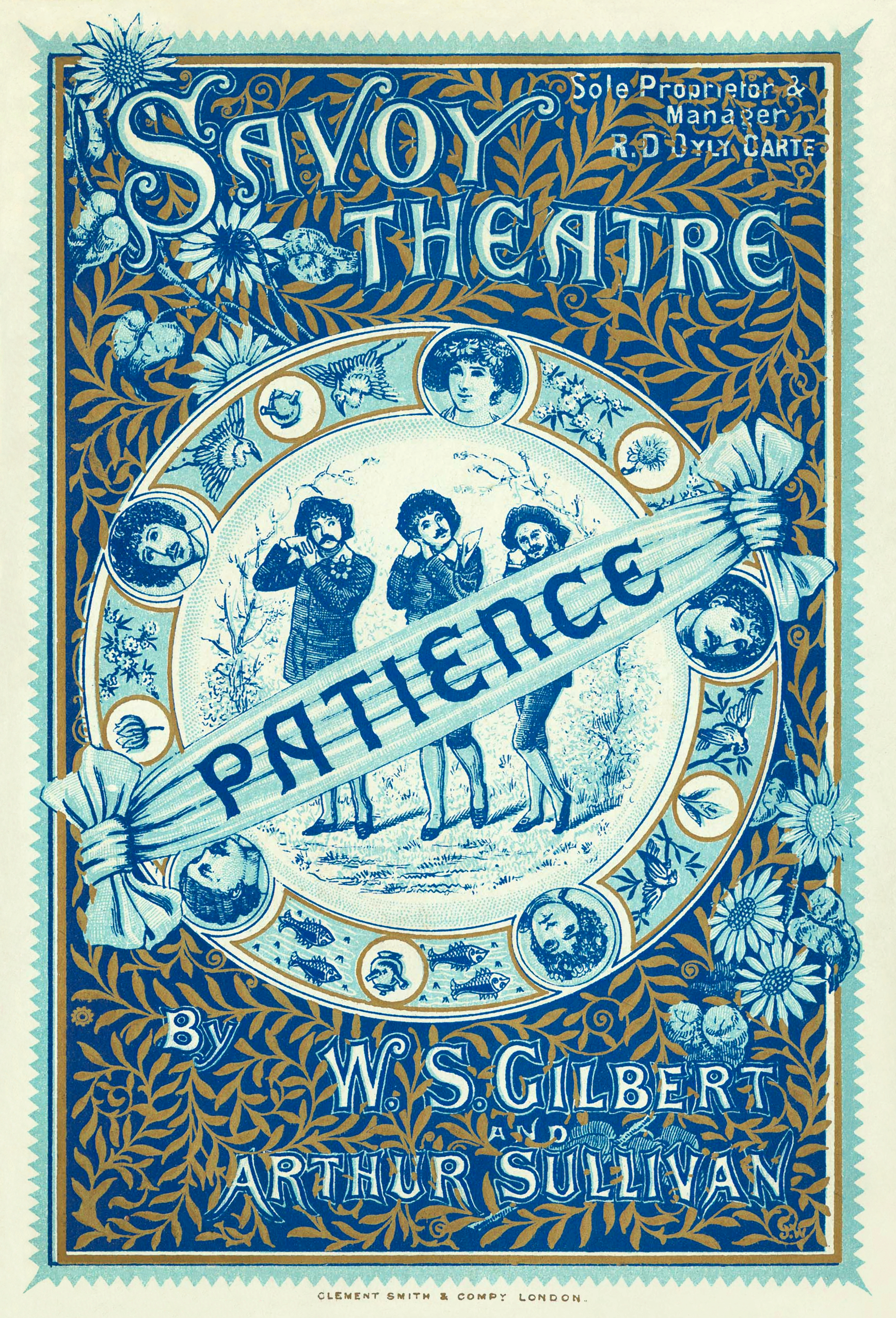
Gilbert and Sullivan play at the Savoy in 1881

The Criterion Theatre opened on Piccadilly Circus on 21 March 1874, and in 1881, two more houses appeared: the Savoy Theatre in The Strand, built by Richard D'Oyly Carte specifically to showcase the comic operas of Gilbert and Sullivan, opened in October (the first theatre and public building to be lit by electric lights, with The Times recording, "the success of the new mode of illumination was complete, and its importance for the development of scenic art can scarcely be overrated"), and five days later the Comedy Theatre opened as the Royal Comedy Theatre on Panton Street in Leicester Square. It abbreviated its name three years later. On 23 December 1886, Alice in Wonderland (the first major production of the Alice books) debuted at the Prince of Wales Theatre. Its author Lewis Carroll was involved in the stage adaptation, and he attended a performance seven days later. The Palace Theatre opened in 1891. Opened in 1892, the Duke of York's Theatre debuted J. M. Barrie's play, Peter Pan, or The Boy Who Wouldn't Grow Up, on 27 December 1904.

Oscar Wilde, one of the most popular playwrights in London in the 1890s, premiered his second comedy, A Woman of No Importance, at Haymarket Theatre in 1893. The subject of widespread public and media interest, Lillie Langtry (an associate of Wilde) made her West End debut in the comedy She Stoops to Conquer in 1881. In 1878, Ellen Terry joined Henry Irving's company as his leading lady, and for more than the next two decades she was considered the leading Shakespearean and comic actress in Britain. Irving, the first actor to be knighted, was an inspiration for the title character in Dracula, with its author Bram Stoker, business manager of the Lyceum and Irving's assistant, praising a performance of Irving as "a wonderful impression of a dead man fictitiously alive [with eyes like] cinders of glowing red from out the marble face". Opened in 1903, the New Theatre debuted The Scarlet Pimpernel in 1905, a play that introduced a heroic figure with an alter ego into the public consciousness. The theatre was renamed the Noël Coward Theatre in 2006 after the playwright Noël Coward. Constructed in 1897, Her Majesty's Theatre hosted a number of premieres, including George Bernard Shaw's Pygmalion in 1914 with Mrs Patrick Campbell originating the role of Cockney flower girl Eliza Doolittle. The theatre building boom continued until about the First World War.

In 1930, Laurence Olivier had his first important West End success in Noël Coward's Private Lives. A number of other actors made their West End debut prior to the Second World War, including John Gielgud, Alec Guinness, Vivien Leigh and Rex Harrison; the latter's performance in Terence Rattigan's 1936 comedy French Without Tears at the Criterion Theatre established him a leading light comedian. During the 1950s and 1960s, many plays were produced in theatre clubs, to evade the censorship then exercised by the Lord Chamberlain's Office. The Theatres Act 1968 finally abolished censorship of the stage in the United Kingdom.

=== Theatreland ===
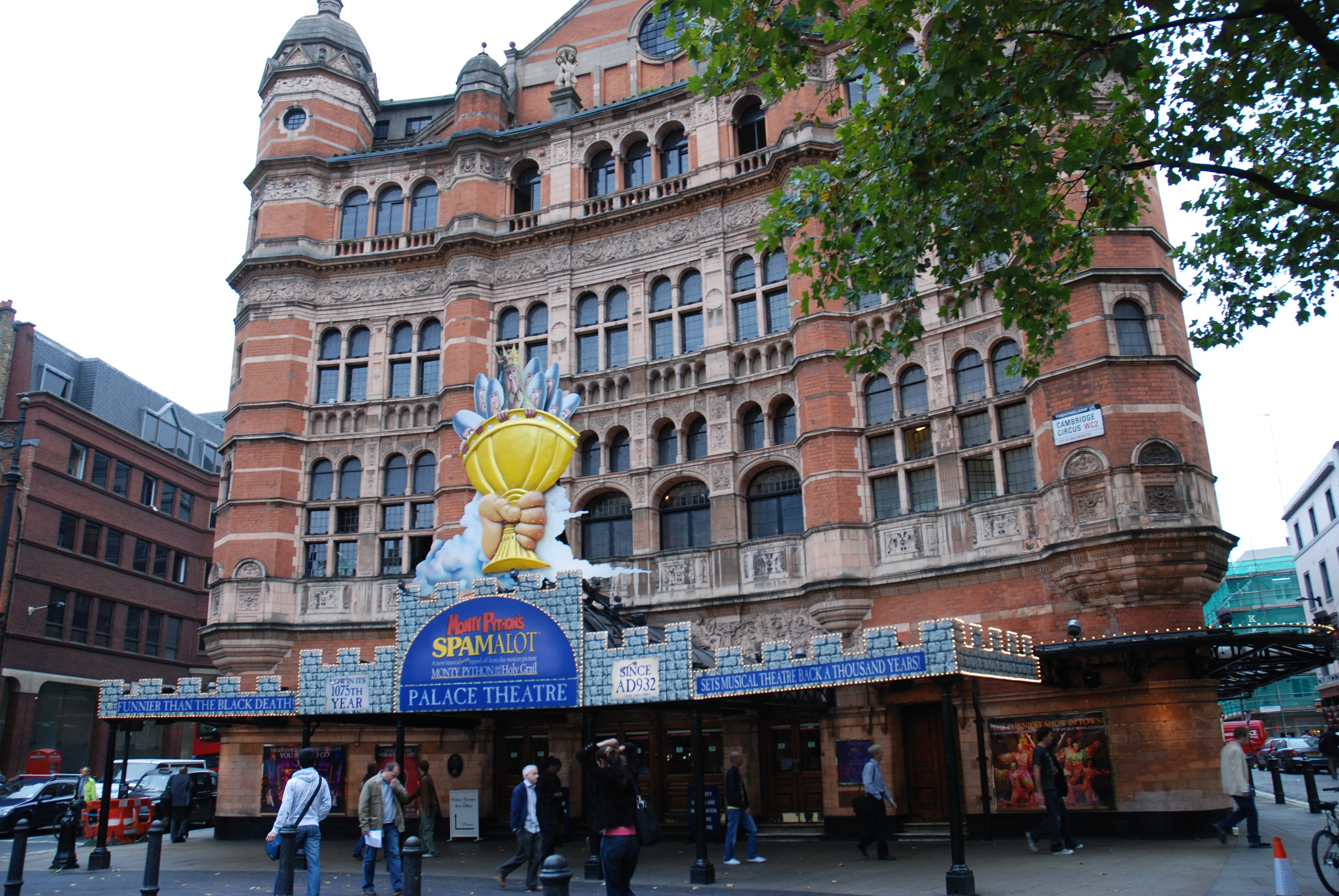
The Palace Theatre (playing Spamalot, an adaptation of Monty Python and the Holy Grail) was opened in 1891.

"Theatreland", London's main theatre district, contains approximately 40 venues and is located in and near the heart of the West End of London. It is traditionally defined by the Strand to the south, Oxford Street to the north, Regent Street to the west, and Kingsway to the east. However, a few other nearby theatres are also considered "West End" despite being outside the area proper; an example is the Apollo Victoria Theatre, in Westminster. Prominent theatre streets include Drury Lane, Shaftesbury Avenue and the Strand. The works staged are predominantly musicals, classic and modern straight plays, and comedy performances.

Many theatres in the West End are of late Victorian or Edwardian construction and are privately owned. Many are architecturally impressive, and the largest and best maintained feature grand neo-classical, Romanesque, or Victorian façades and luxurious, detailed interior design and decoration. Theatre names, such as Empire, Lyceum, Palladium, Alhambra and Hippodrome, emphasised a grandeur of scale.

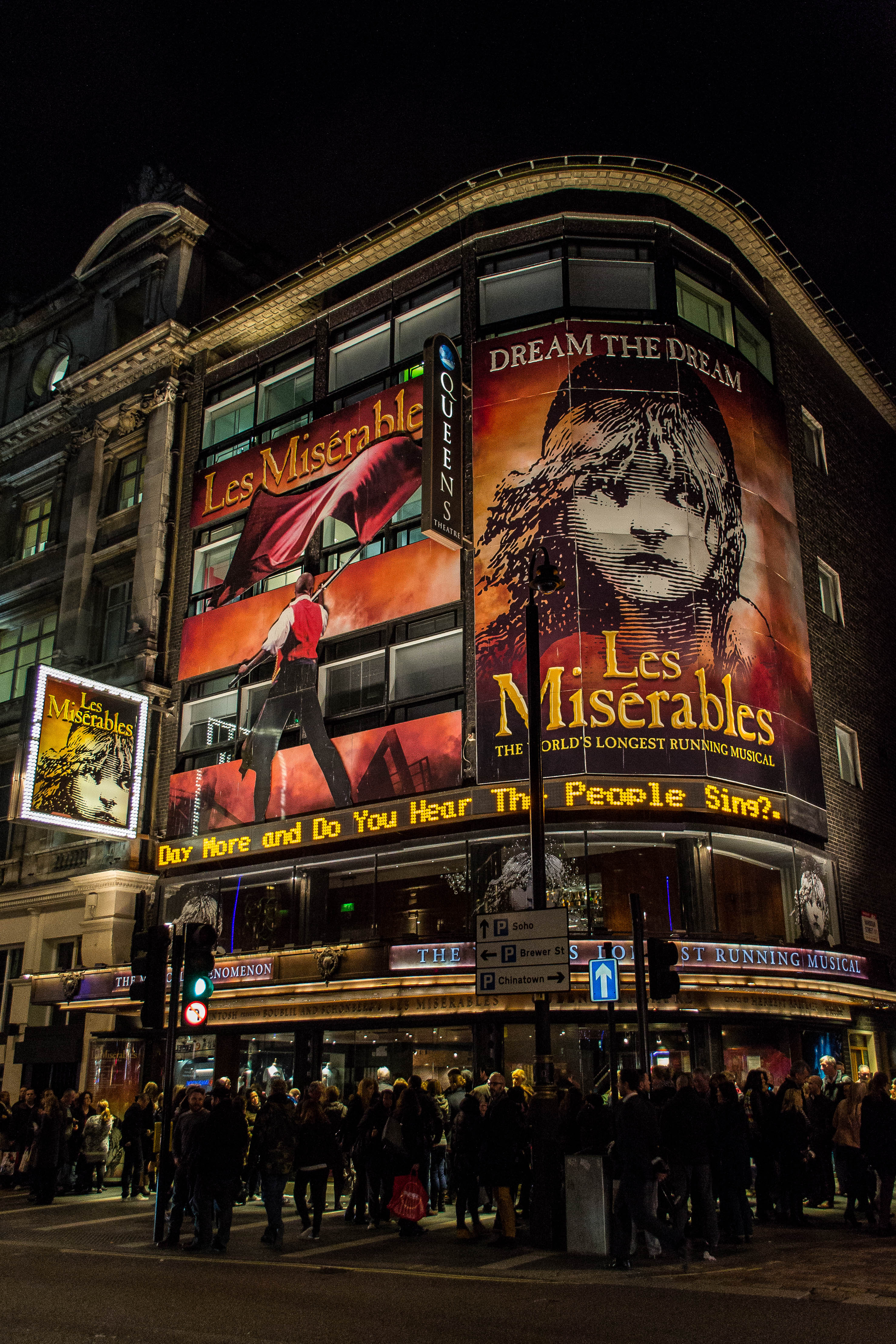
Queen's Theatre showing Les Misérables, running in London since October 1985

However, owing to the age of the buildings, leg room is often cramped, and audience facilities such as bars and toilets are often much smaller than in modern theatres. The protected status of the buildings and their confined urban locations, combined with financial constraints, make it very difficult to make substantial improvements to the level of comfort offered. Delfont Mackintosh Theatres, which owns eight London theatres, refurbished all of their theatres beginning with the Prince Edward Theatre in 1992, with the group's owner, Sir Cameron Mackintosh, later producing the stage musical Mary Poppins (having acquired the rights from the book's author P. L. Travers) in the same theatre; in 2005, Julie Andrews, who as a child actress and singer debuted in the West End in 1948 before playing Mary Poppins on screen, appeared onstage during the musical's curtain calls. In 2003, the Theatres Trust estimated that an investment of £250 million over the following 15 years was required for modernisation, and stated that 60% of theatres had seats from which the stage was not fully visible.

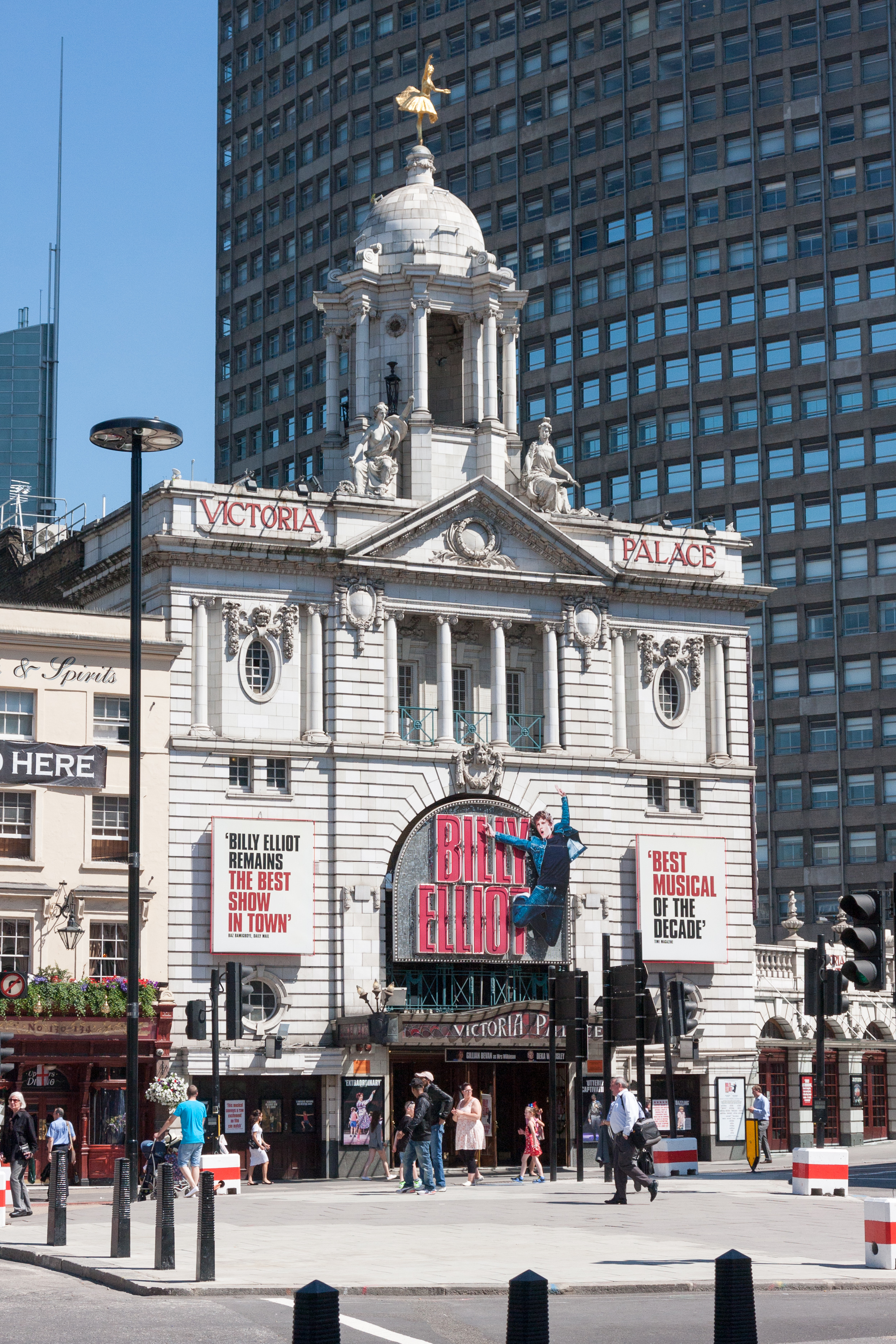
Victoria Palace Theatre (showing Billy Elliot in 2012) was refurbished in 2017.

Starting in 2004, there were several incidents of falling plasterwork, or performances being cancelled because of urgent building repairs being required. These events culminated in the partial collapse of the ceiling of the Apollo Theatre in December 2013. Of these earlier incidents, only one led to people being hurt, but at the Apollo 76 people needed medical treatment for their injuries. A number of West End theatres have undergone refurbishments, including the Victoria Palace Theatre following the run of Billy Elliot in 2016. The Dominion Theatre refurbishment was completed in 2017 with the unveiling of a new double-sided LED screen, the largest and highest resolution projecting screen on the exterior of a West End theatre.

In 2012, gross sales of £529,787,692 were up 0.27% and attendances also increased 0.56% to 13,992,773-year-on-year. In 2013, sales again rose this time by 11% to £585,506,455, with attendances rising to 14,587,276. This was despite slightly fewer performances occurring in 2013.

On 16 March 2020, following government advice due to the COVID-19 pandemic, all theatres in the West End were closed until further notice. Theatres in London were allowed to re-open (with social distancing) on 17 May 2021, with full capacity permitted from 19 July. Opening in October 2022, @sohoplace is the first new West End theatre in 50 years.

== Long-running shows ==
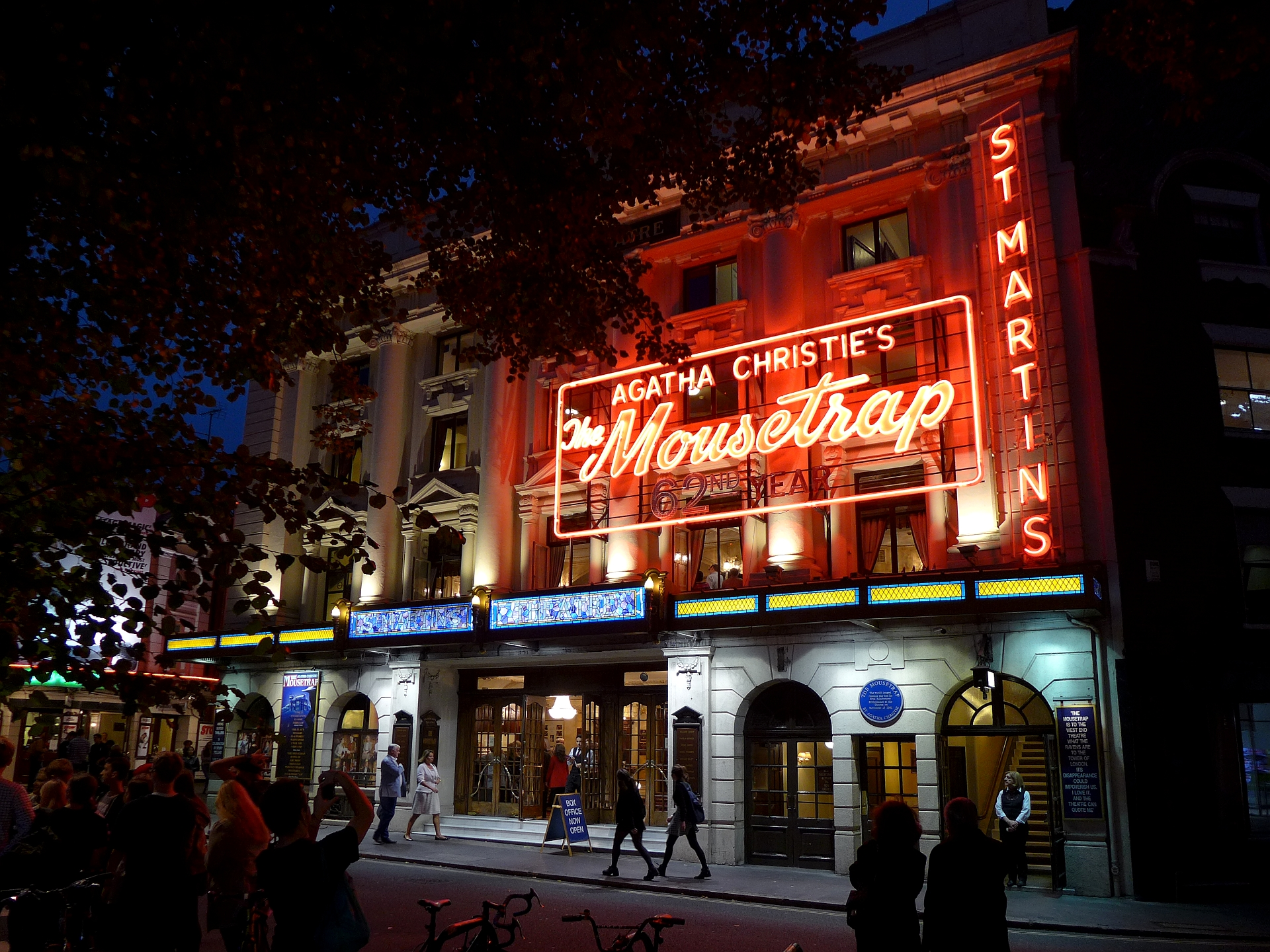
St Martin's Theatre, home to Agatha Christie's The Mousetrap, the world's longest-running play.

The length of West End shows depends on ticket sales. Agatha Christie's murder mystery play The Mousetrap is the longest-running production in the West End and the world, and has been performed continuously since 1952. The longest-running musical in West End history is Les Misérables, produced by Cameron Mackintosh, which has been running in London since October 1985. It overtook Andrew Lloyd Webber's Cats, which closed in 2002 after running for 8,949 performances and 21 years, as the longest-running West End musical of all time on 9 October 2006. Other long-runners include Lloyd Webber's The Phantom of the Opera, Willy Russell's Blood Brothers, and Catherine Johnson's ABBA-inspired jukebox musical Mamma Mia! which have also subsequently overtaken Cats.

Running since 2011, Matilda the Musical, an adaptation of Roald Dahl's Matilda, won a then-record seven Olivier Awards in 2012. Running since 2016, Harry Potter and the Cursed Child, a two-part play written by Jack Thorne based on an original story by J. K. Rowling, won a record-breaking nine Olivier Awards in 2017.

== List of West End theatres ==
- An * after the opening date indicates that the listed production has yet to open and is scheduled for the given date at that theatre.
- An * after the closing date indicates that there is another show scheduled for that theatre.
- If the next show planned is not announced, the applicable columns are left blank.

Theatre	Address	Opened	Capacity	Owner/Operator	Current production	Type	Opening	Closing
Adelphi Theatre	Strand	1806	1,500	LW Theatres / Nederlander Organization	The Lives of Others	Play	29 October 2026	9 January 2027*
Aldwych Theatre	Aldwych	1905	1,200	Nederlander Organization	Sinatra: The Musical	Musical	24 June 2026	Open-ended
Ambassadors Theatre	West Street	1913	444	ATG Entertainment	Paranormal Activity	Play	8 August 2026	27 February 2027
Apollo Theatre	Shaftesbury Avenue	1901	658	Nimax Theatres	Derren Brown: Only Human	Magic	10 October 2026	30 January 2027
Apollo Victoria Theatre	Wilton Road	1930	2,328	ATG Entertainment	Wicked	Musical	27 September 2006	Open-ended
Arts Theatre	Great Newport Street	1927	350	JJ Goodman Ltd.				
Cambridge Theatre	Earlham Street	1930	1,231	LW Theatres	Matilda the Musical	Musical	24 November 2011	Open-ended
Criterion Theatre	Jermyn Street	1874	588	Criterion Theatre Trust	Titanique	Musical	9 January 2025	3 January 2027*
Dominion Theatre	Tottenham Court Road	1929	2,163	Nederlander Organization	The Devil Wears Prada	Musical	5 December 2024	Open-ended
Duchess Theatre	Catherine Street	1929	494	Nimax Theatres	The Play That Goes Wrong	Play	14 September 2014	Open-ended
Fortune Theatre	Russell Street	1924	432	ATG Entertainment	Operation Mincemeat	Musical	29 March 2023	29 May 2027
Garrick Theatre	Charing Cross Road	1889	718	Nimax Theatres	One Day: The Musical	Musical	17 November 2026	14 March 2027
Gielgud Theatre	Shaftesbury Avenue	1906	994	Delfont Mackintosh Theatres	Oliver!	Musical	14 January 2025	Open-ended
Gillian Lynne Theatre	Drury Lane	1973	1,118	LW Theatres	My Neighbour Totoro	Play	20 March 2025	8 January 2027*
Harold Pinter Theatre	Panton Street	1881	796	ATG Entertainment	The Cherry Orchard	Play	13 October 2026	9 January 2027
His Majesty's Theatre	Haymarket	1897	1,216	LW Theatres	The Phantom of the Opera	Musical	9 October 1986	Open-ended
London Palladium	Argyll Street	1910	2,286	LW Theatres	Cinderella	Pantomime	5 December 2026*	10 January 2027
Lyceum Theatre	Wellington Street	1834	2,100	ATG Entertainment	The Lion King	Musical	19 October 1999	Open-ended
Lyric Theatre	Shaftesbury Avenue	1888	915	Nimax Theatres	Hadestown	Musical	21 February 2024	Open-ended
Noël Coward Theatre	St. Martin's Lane	1903	942	Delfont Mackintosh Theatres	Into the Woods	Musical	7 October 2026	9 January 2027*
Novello Theatre	Aldwych	1905	1,146	Delfont Mackintosh Theatres	Mamma Mia!	Musical	6 April 1999	Open-ended
Palace Theatre	Shaftesbury Avenue	1891	1,400	Nimax Theatres	Harry Potter and the Cursed Child	Play	25 July 2016	Open-ended
Phoenix Theatre	Charing Cross Road	1930	1,012	ATG Entertainment	Stranger Things: The First Shadow	Play	14 December 2023	27 December 2026*
Piccadilly Theatre	Denman Street	1928	1,232	ATG Entertainment	Moulin Rouge! The Musical	Musical	20 January 2022	Open-ended
Playhouse Theatre	Craven Street	1882	550	ATG Entertainment	Cabaret	Musical	12 December 2021	Open-ended
Prince Edward Theatre	Old Compton Street	1930	1,727	Delfont Mackintosh Theatres	Beetlejuice	Musical	28 May 2026	2 January 2027*
Prince of Wales Theatre	Coventry Street	1884	1,148	Delfont Mackintosh Theatres	The Book of Mormon	Musical	21 March 2013	Open-ended
Savoy Theatre	Strand	1881	1,150	ATG Entertainment	Paddington: The Musical	Musical	30 November 2025	Open-ended
Shaftesbury Theatre	Shaftesbury Avenue	1911	1,416	DLT Entertainment	Avenue Q	Musical	16 April 2026	3 January 2027*
@sohoplace	Charing Cross Road	2022	602	Nimax Theatres	Who's Afraid of Virginia Woolf?	Play	30 September 2026	19 December 2026
Sondheim Theatre	Shaftesbury Avenue	1907	1,137	Delfont Mackintosh Theatres	Les Misérables	Musical	8 October 1985	Open-ended
St Martin's Theatre	West Street	1916	550	Stephen Waley-Cohen	The Mousetrap	Play	25 November 1952	Open-ended
Theatre Royal, Drury Lane	Catherine Street	1663	1,996	LW Theatres	Jesus Christ Superstar	Musical	16 October 2026	9 January 2027*
Theatre Royal Haymarket	Haymarket	1821	888	Access Entertainment	The Standard of Living	Play	29 September 2026	12 December 2026*
Tom Stoppard Theatre	St. Martin's Lane	1892	640	ATG Entertainment	Rent	Musical	8 October 2026	27 March 2027
Trafalgar Theatre	Whitehall	1930	630	Trafalgar Entertainment	Oh, Mary!	Play	18 December 2025	Open-ended
Vaudeville Theatre	Strand	1870	690	Nimax Theatres	Six	Musical	17 January 2019	Open-ended
Victoria Palace Theatre	Victoria Street	1911	1,557	Delfont Mackintosh Theatres	Hamilton	Musical	21 December 2017	Open-ended
Wyndham's Theatre	St. Martin's Court	1899	799	Delfont Mackintosh Theatres	Hay Fever	Play	1 October 2026	12 December 2026*

=== Upcoming productions ===
The following shows are confirmed as future West End productions. The theatre in which they will run is either not yet known or currently occupied by another show.

Production	Type	Theatre	Opening	Ref
Amadeus	Play	Noël Coward Theatre	27 April 2027	
August: Osage County	Play	Noël Coward Theatre	18 January 2027	
Bill Bailey: Vaudevillean	Comedy	Theatre Royal Haymarket	16 December 2026	
Billy Elliot the Musical	Musical	Adelphi Theatre	12 February 2027	
Christmas Carol Goes Wrong	Play	Wyndham's Theatre	18 December 2026	
Dirty Dancing	Musical	Prince Edward Theatre	19 January 2027	
The Greatest Showman	Musical	Theatre Royal Drury Lane	5 May 2027	
The History Boys	Play	Theatre Royal Haymarket	10 April 2027	
The Humans	Play	Theatre Royal Haymarket	30 October 2027	
John Proctor Is the Villain	Play	Wyndham's Theatre	11 February 2027	
Miss Saigon	Musical	Prince Edward Theatre	13 May 2027	
Nanny McPhee	Musical	Aldwych Theatre	6 November 2027	
The Notebook	Musical	Judi Dench Theatre	13 April 2027	
The Popinjay Cavalier	Play	Phoenix Theatre	18 March 2027	
Redcliffe	Musical	Criterion Theatre	4 February 2027	
The Traitors: Acts of Betrayal	Play	Gillian Lynne Theatre	8 June 2027	

== London's non-commercial theatres ==
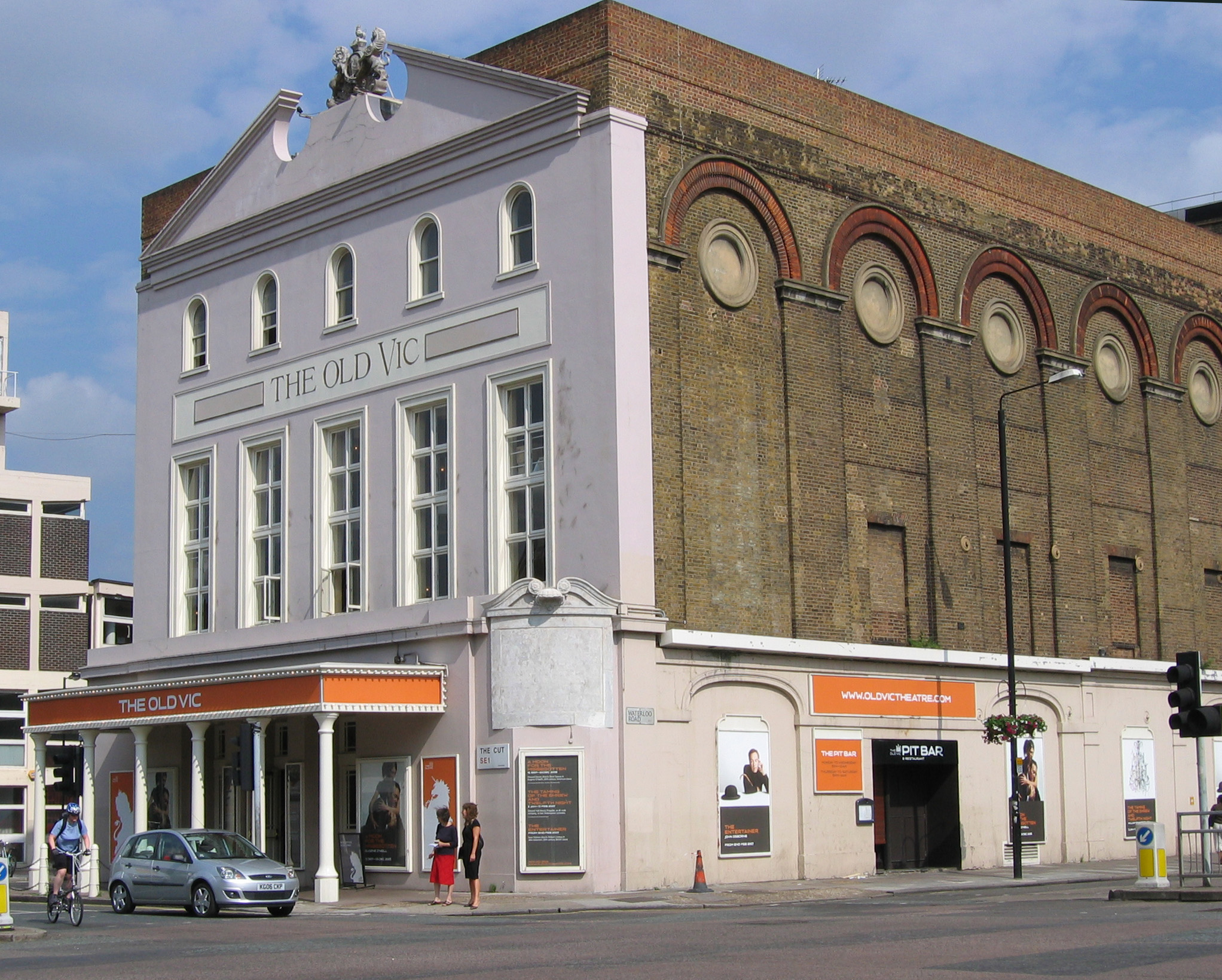
The exterior of the Old Vic

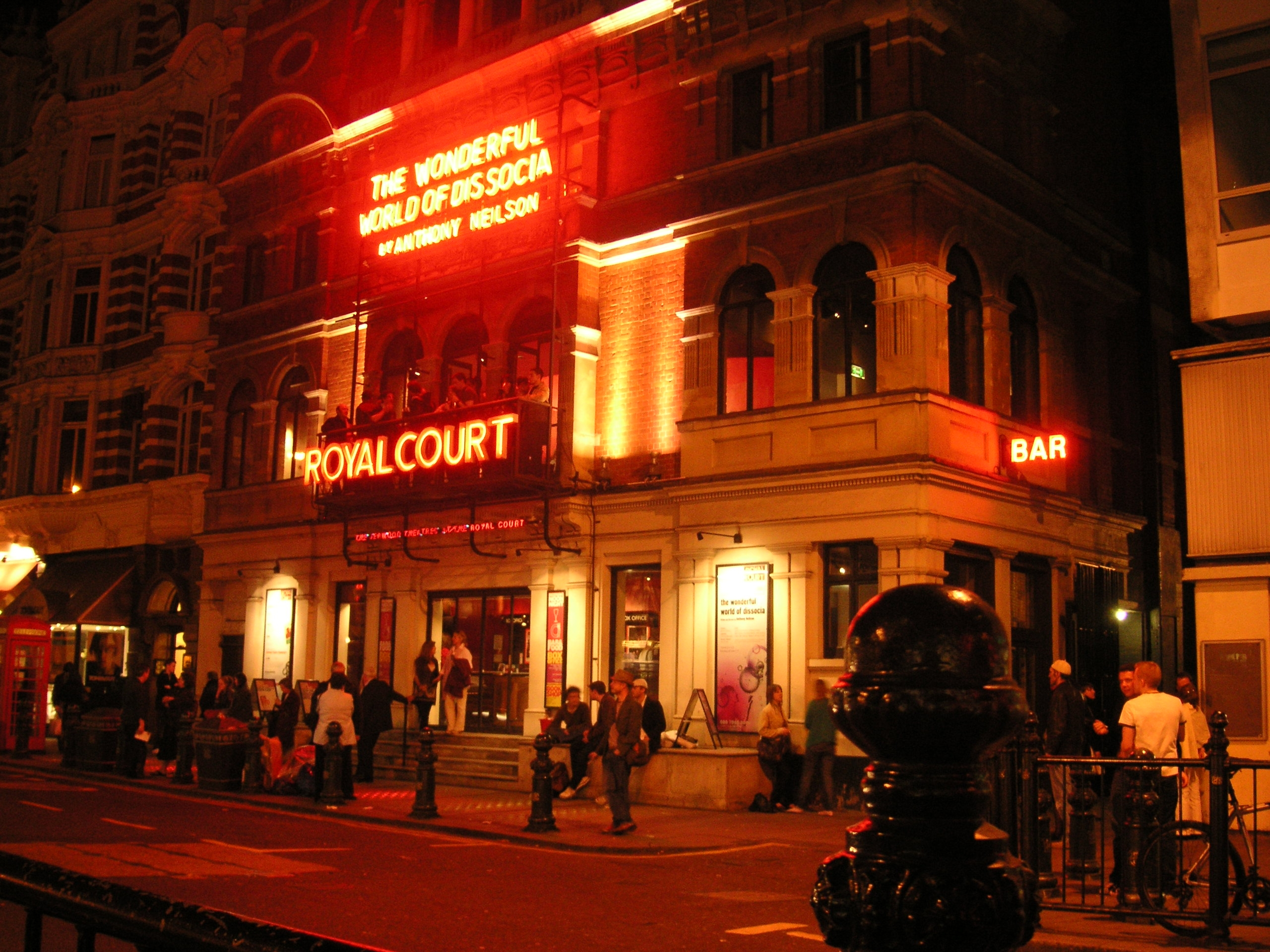
The Royal Court Theatre. Upstairs is used as an experimental space for new projects—The Rocky Horror Show premiered here in 1973.

The term "West End theatre" is generally used to refer specifically to commercial productions in Theatreland. However, the leading non-commercial theatres in London enjoy great artistic prestige. These include the National Theatre, the Barbican Centre, Shakespeare's Globe (including the Sam Wanamaker Playhouse), the Old Vic, Royal Court Theatre, Sadler's Wells Theatre, and the Regent's Park Open Air Theatre. These theatres stage a high proportion of straight drama, Shakespeare, other classic plays and premieres of new plays by leading playwrights—for example David Hare's play Pravda starring Anthony Hopkins which was described by The Telegraph as "one of the biggest hits in the history of the National Theatre." Successful productions from the non-commercial theatres sometimes transfer to one of the commercial West End houses for an extended run.

The Royal Opera House is widely regarded as one of the world's great opera houses, with its current incarnation opened in 1858. Commonly known simply as Covent Garden due to its location, it is home to the Royal Opera, Royal Ballet and a resident symphony orchestra, and hosts guest performances from other leading opera, ballet and performance companies from around the world. In 1735 its first season of operas, by George Frideric Handel, began and many of his English oratorios were specifically written for Covent Garden and had their premieres here.

Likewise, the London Coliseum is the resident home to the English National Opera. The theatre is also the London base for performances by the English National Ballet, who perform regular seasons throughout the year when not on tour. The Peacock Theatre is located on the edge of the Theatreland area. Now owned by the London School of Economics and Political Science, it is used in the evenings for dance performances by Sadler's Wells, who manage the theatre on behalf of the school.

== Other London theatres ==
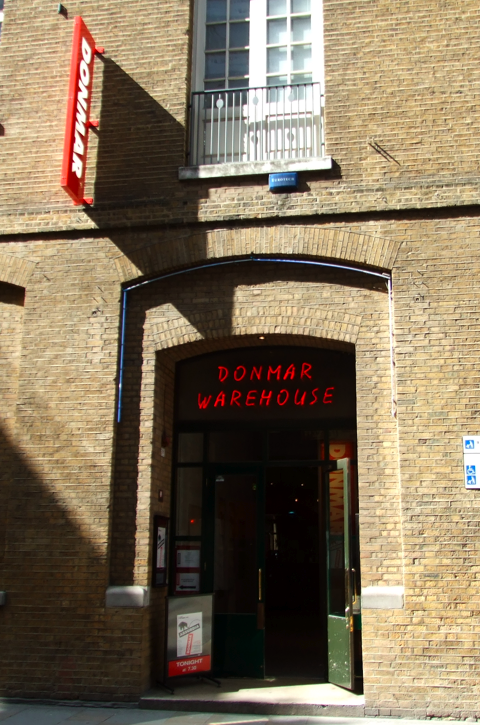
Opened in 1977, the Donmar Warehouse became an independent producing house in 1992 with Sam Mendes as artistic director.

There are a great number of stage productions in London outside the West End. Much of this is known as fringe theatre (referred to as Off West End) which is the equivalent of off-Broadway and off-off-Broadway theatre in New York City. Among these are the Menier Chocolate Factory, Bush Theatre and the Donmar Warehouse. Fringe venues range from well-equipped small theatres to rooms above pubs, and the performances range from classic plays, to cabaret, to plays in the languages of London's ethnic minorities. The performers range from emerging young professionals to amateurs. Productions at the Donmar included the 1980 play Educating Rita which starred Julie Walters in the title role before she reprised the role in the 1983 film adaptation of the same name.

There are many theatres located throughout Greater London, such as the Lyric Hammersmith, Theatre Royal Stratford East, the Rose Theatre Kingston, the New Wimbledon Theatre, the Rudolph Steiner Theatre in Westminster, the Ashcroft Theatre in Croydon, the Secombe Theatre in Sutton, the Churchill Theatre in Bromley and the Hackney Empire in Hackney.

The theatre at the Royal Polytechnic Institution (now the University of Westminster) in Regent Street saw the first public demonstration of "Pepper's ghost"—a method of projecting the illusion of a ghost into a theatre (named after its developer John Henry Pepper)—during an 1862 Christmas Eve theatrical production of the Charles Dickens novel, The Haunted Man and the Ghost's Bargain, which caused a sensation among those in attendance.

London theatres outside the West End also played an important role in the early history of drama schools. In 1833, actress Frances Maria Kelly managed the Royal Strand Theatre in Westminster where she funded and operated a dramatic school, the earliest record of a drama school in England. In 1840, she financed the Royalty Theatre in Soho which opened as Miss Kelly's Theatre and Dramatic School.

== Awards ==
"Theatre is such an important part of British history and British culture"

— Dame Helen Mirren after receiving the Evening Standard Theatre Award for Best Actress in 2013 for her performance as the Queen Elizabeth II in The Audience.

There are a number of annual awards for outstanding achievements in London theatre:

- Laurence Olivier Awards
- Standard Theatre Awards
- WhatsOnStage Awards
- Critics' Circle Theatre Awards
- Ian Charleson Awards
- National Dance Awards
- West End Frame Awards

== See also ==
- Culture of London
- Great West End Theatres
- List of former theatres in London
- List of London venues
- London International Festival of Theatre
- Theatre of the United Kingdom
