= Nica Burns =

British theatre producer

Nica Burns CBE
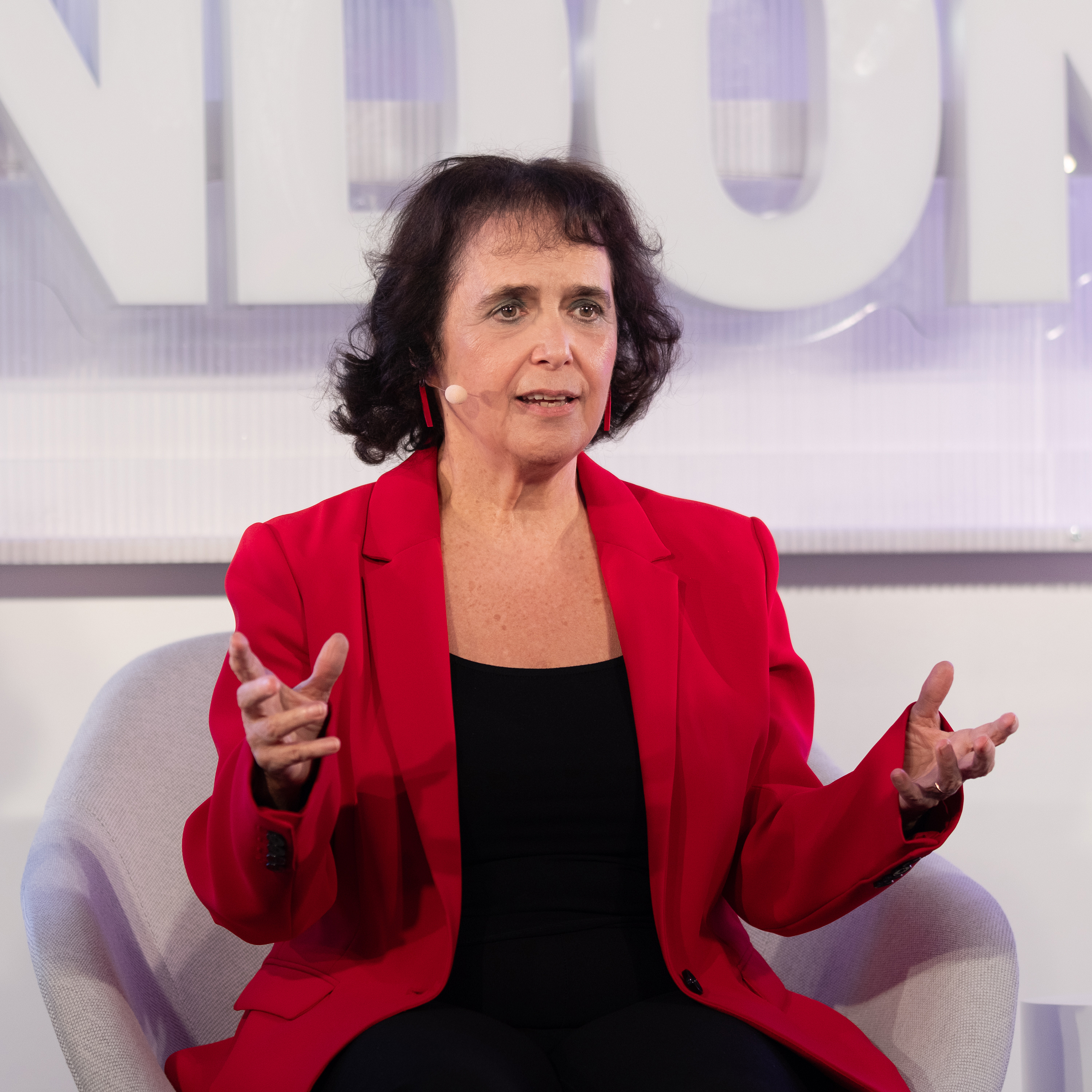
- Nica Burns at SXSW London 2026
- Born: Lounica Maureen Patricia Burns; August 1954 (age 72)
- Education: Haberdashers' Aske's School for Girls; University College London
- Occupations: London theatre producer and owner
- Known for: Nimax Theatres
- Spouse: Marc Hutchinson

Lounica Maureen Patricia "Nica" Burns CBE (born August 1954) is a London theatre producer and co-owner with her business partner Max Weitzenhoffer of the Nimax Theatres group, comprising six West End theatres: the Palace, Lyric, Apollo, Garrick, Vaudeville and Duchess. She also owns @sohoplace which opened in 2022 and is operated by Nimax Theatres.

== Early years and education ==
Nica Burns was born in August 1954, and grew up in Ealing, London. She was educated at Haberdashers' Aske's School for Girls, when it was located in Acton. In 1973, she went to University College London to read for a law degree.

== Career ==
Following an early career in acting, Burns moved to directing and producing, co-writing and performing in H. E. Bates's Dulcima at the Edinburgh Festival Fringe. She has been director and producer of the Edinburgh Comedy Awards (formerly Perrier Awards) from 1984 to the present day.

She was appointed Officer of the Order of the British Empire (OBE) in the 2013 New Year Honours and Commander of the Order of the British Empire (CBE) in the 2024 Birthday Honours, both for services to theatre.

At the 2013 Private Business Awards, Burns was awarded Private Businesswoman of the Year.

The Apollo was the centre of a news story on 19 December 2013, when portions of the ceiling collapsed, landing on the audience.

== Personal life ==
Burns is married to Australian-born finance lawyer Marc Hutchinson, a partner at Slaughter and May, and chairman of the Heath and Hampstead Society since 2014. They met when they were both law students at University College London.
