= Victoria Palace Theatre =

West End theatre in London

- 1832: Moy's Music Hall; 1863: Royal Standard Music Hall
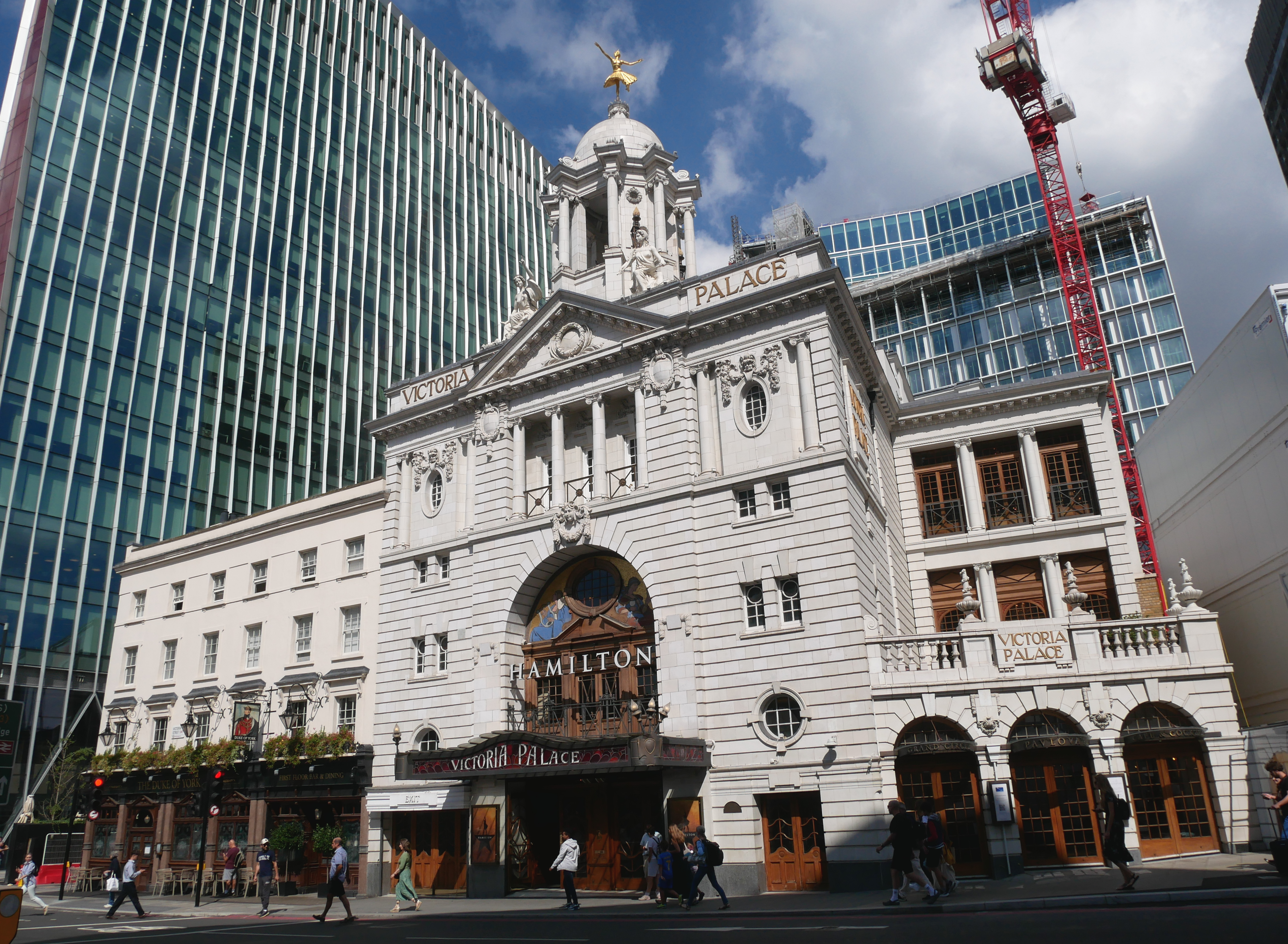
- The Victoria Palace in 2022
- Interactive map of Victoria Palace Theatre
- Address: Victoria Street; London, SW1; United Kingdom
- Coordinates: 51°29′49″N 00°08′33″W
- Owner: Delfont Mackintosh Theatres
- Capacity: 1,557 on 3 levels
- Type: West End theatre
- Production: Hamilton

Listed Building – Grade II*
- Official name: Victoria Palace Theatre
- Designated: 23 June 1972
- Reference no.: 1238140
- Public transit: Victoria

Construction
- Opened: 1911; 115 years ago
- Rebuilt: 2016 – 2017 (Aedas Arts Team)
- Architect: Frank Matcham

Website
- Victoria Palace Theatre official website

The Victoria Palace Theatre is a West End theatre in Victoria Street, in the City of Westminster. The theatre was designed by Frank Matcham in 1911 and was the last London theatre he designed before his retirement. The building was designated as a Grade II* listed building by Historic England in 1972. It has been the West End home of the musical Hamilton since 2017.

== History ==
=== Origins ===
The theatre began life as a small concert room above the stables of the Royal Standard Hotel, a small hotel and tavern built in 1832 at what was then 522 Stockbridge Terrace, on the site of the present theatre – not, as sometimes stated, on land where the train station now stands. The proprietor, John Moy, enlarged the building, and by 1850 it became known as Moy's Music Hall. Alfred Brown took it over in 1863, refurbished it, and renamed it the Royal Standard Music Hall.

The hotel was demolished in 1886, by which time the main line terminus, Victoria Station and its new Grosvenor Hotel, had transformed the area into a major transport hub. The railways were at this time building grand hotel structures at their termini, and Victoria was one of the first. Added to this was the integration of the electric underground system and the building of Victoria Street. The owner of the music hall, Thomas Dickey, had it rebuilt along more ambitious lines in 1886 by Richard Wake, retaining the name Royal Standard Music Hall.

=== Matcham's theatre ===
The Royal Standard was demolished in 1910, and in its place was built, at a cost of £12,000, the current theatre, The Victoria Palace. It was designed by prolific theatre architect Frank Matcham, and opened 6 November 1911. The original design featured a sliding roof that helped cool the auditorium during intervals in the summer months.

Under impresario Alfred Butt, the Victoria Palace Theatre continued the musical theatre tradition by presenting mainly varieties, and under later managements, repertory and revues. Perhaps because of its music hall linkage, the plays were not always taken seriously. In 1934, the theatre presented Young England, a patriotic play written by the Rev. Walter Reynolds, then 83. It received such amusingly bad reviews that it became a cult hit and played to full houses for 278 performances before transferring to two other West End theatres.

Intended by its author as a serious work celebrating the triumph of good over evil and the virtues of the Boy Scout Movement, it was received as an uproarious comedy. Before long, audiences had learned the key lines and were joining in at all the choicest moments. The scoutmistress rarely said the line 'I must go and attend to my girls' water' without at least fifty voices in good-humoured support.

A return to revue brought new success. Me and My Girl was a hit in its original production at the theatre, opening in 1937 starring Lupino Lane. In 1939, songs from this show formed the first live broadcast of a performance by the BBC, and listeners could sing along to The Lambeth Walk. In early 1945, towards the end of the war in Europe, variety was presented under the stewardship of Lupino Lane. Headlining the bill from his radio series was Will Hay, with his schoolboy retinue of Charles Hawtrey and John Clark, and among the "turns" was Stainless Stephen, a comic acrobat comedian duo, and Victor Barna (then world champion table tennis player) giving an exhibition, who would invite audience members up on to the stage to see if they could beat him in ten points. From 1947 through 1962, Jack Hylton produced The Crazy Gang series of comedy revues, with a glittering company of variety performers including Flanagan and Allen, Nervo and Knox, and Naughton and Gold.

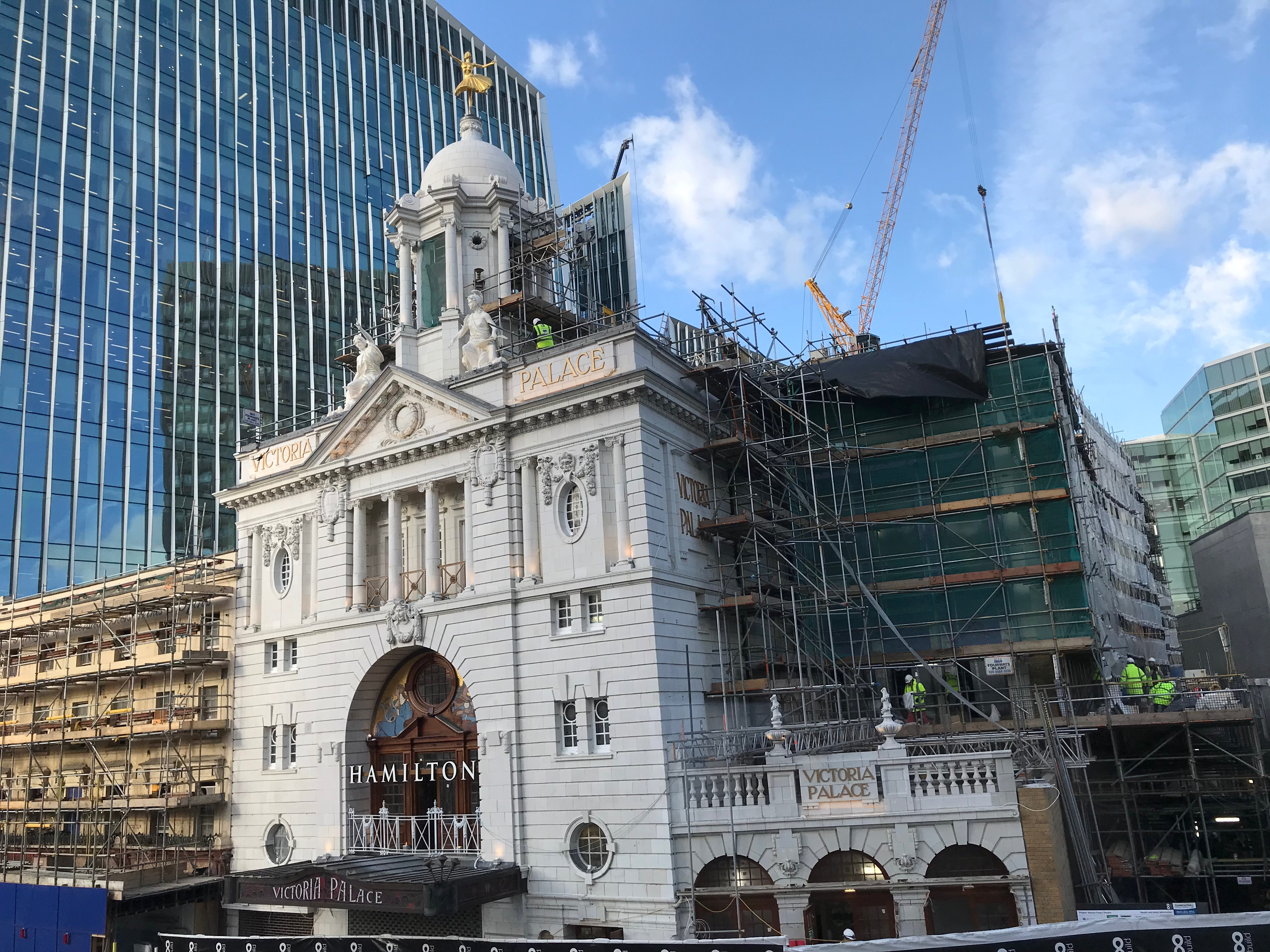
The theatre near the end of its 2016 – 2017 refurbishment

The long-running Black and White Minstrel Show played through the 1960s until 1972. In 1982, a production of The Little Foxes, saw Elizabeth Taylor making her London stage debut. Another unusually long-running show at the theatre was Buddy – The Buddy Holly Story, that played for 13 years in London, beginning in 1989 (transferring to the Strand Theatre in 1995). The theatre was purchased by Stephen Waley-Cohen in 1991. After this, the theatre presented mostly revivals of well-known musicals. In 2005, Billy Elliot the Musical opened, garnering rave reviews and Olivier Awards.

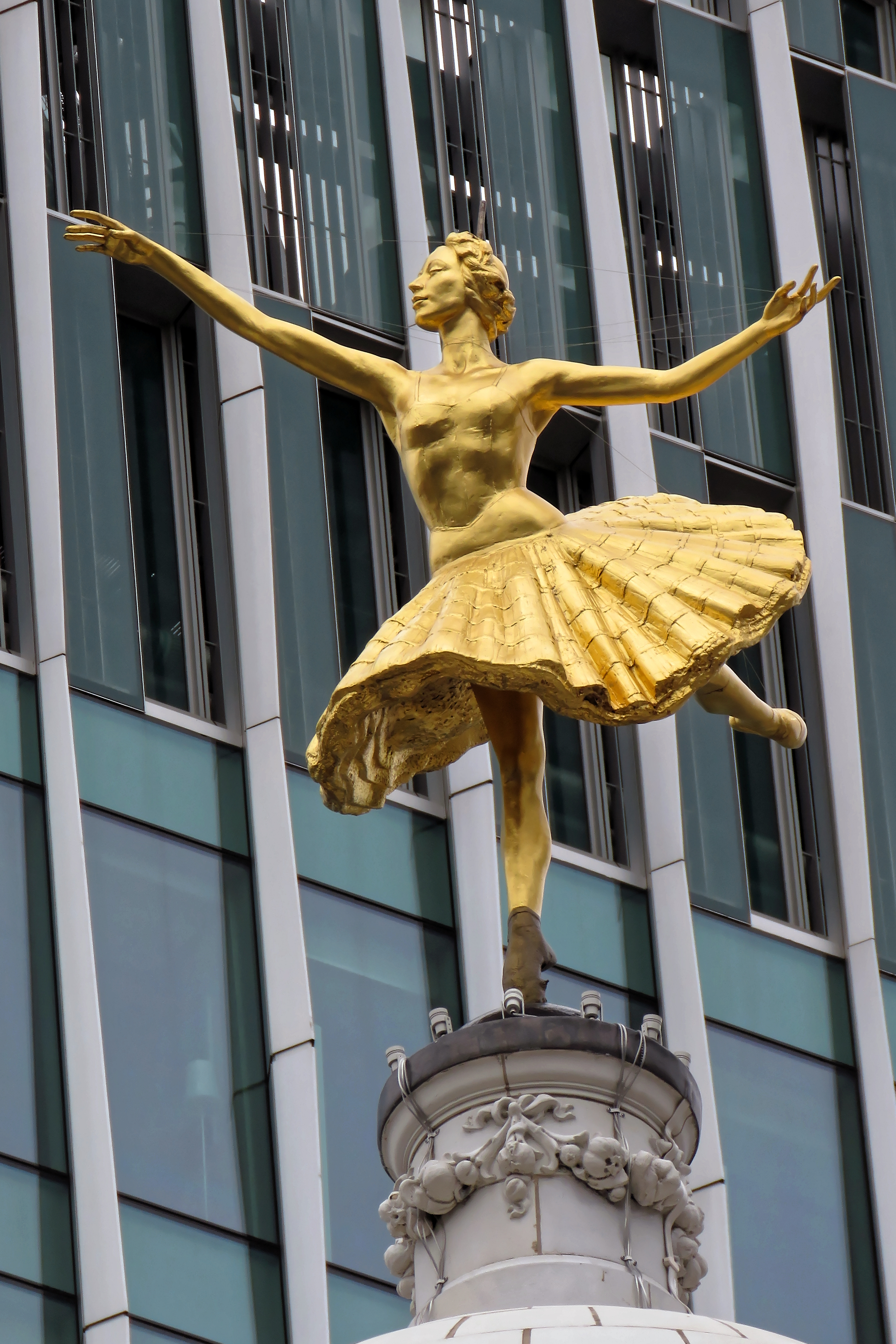
The replica statue of Anna Pavlova

At the opening in 1911, a gilded statue of ballerina Anna Pavlova was positioned above the cupola of the theatre. This was taken down for its safety during World War II, and was lost. In 2006, a replica of the original statue was restored in its place.

In 2014, the theatre was sold to Delfont Mackintosh Theatres. After Billy Elliot ended its run in April 2016, the theatre closed for a multi-million pound refurbishment. In December 2017, the Broadway musical Hamilton re-opened the refurbished Victoria Palace.

== Notable productions ==
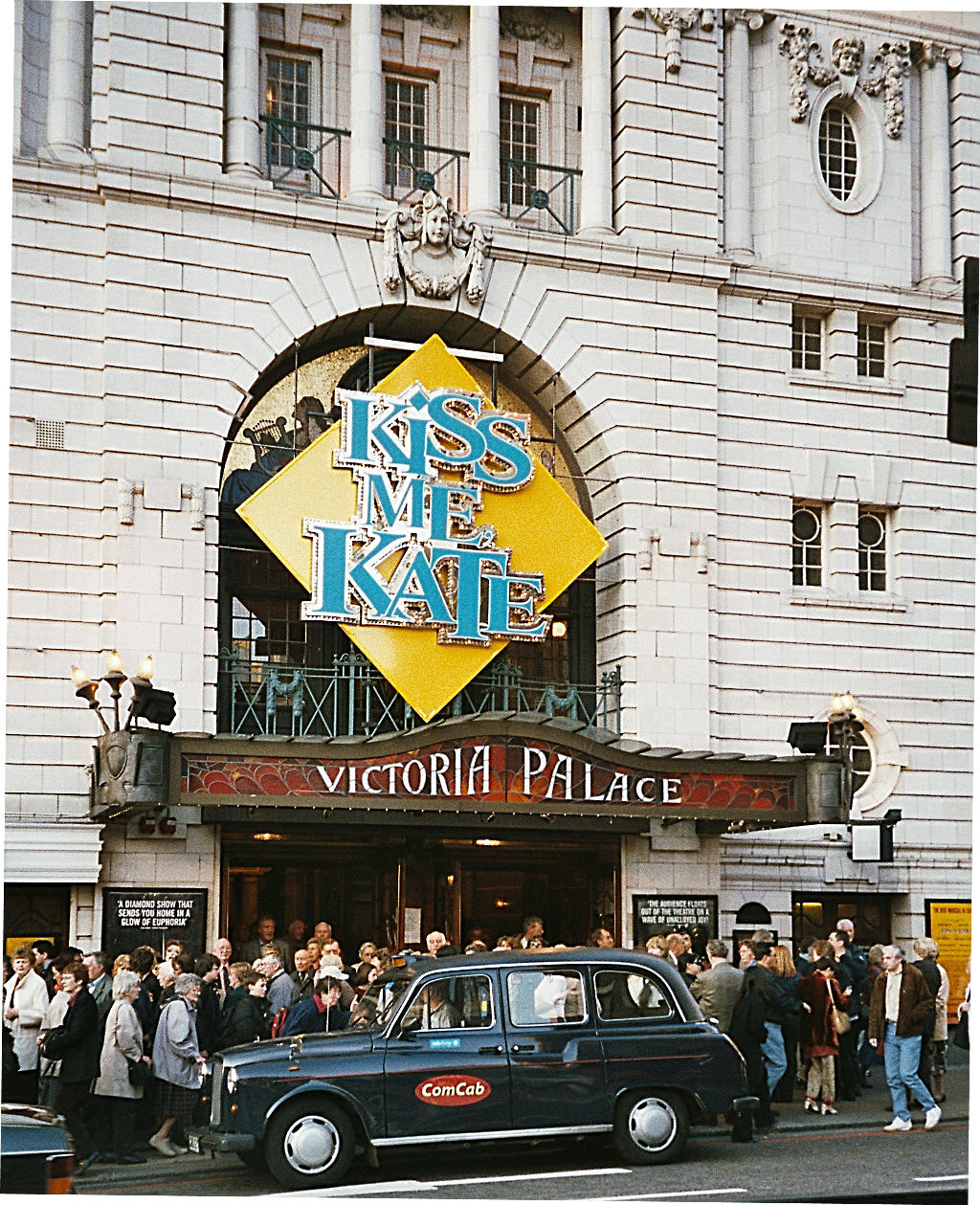
The Victoria Palace Theatre during the 2002 season, showing Cole Porter's 1948 musical comedy Kiss Me, Kate

- 1930: The Chelsea Follies
- 1934: Young England
- 1937: Me and My Girl
- 1945: Variety
- 1947: The Crazy Gang
- 1962: The Black and White Minstrel Show
- 1973: Carry On London!
- 1976: Cilla at the Palace
- 1978: Annie
- 1982: Windy City
- 1982: The Little Foxes
- 1986: Barnum
- 1986: Charlie Girl
- 1987: High Society
- 1989: Buddy – The Buddy Holly Story
- 1995: Jolson
- 1999: The Pajama Game
- 2000: Fame
- 2001: Kiss Me, Kate
- 2002: Grease
- 2003: Tonight's the Night
- 2005: Billy Elliot the Musical
- 2017: Hamilton: An American Musical

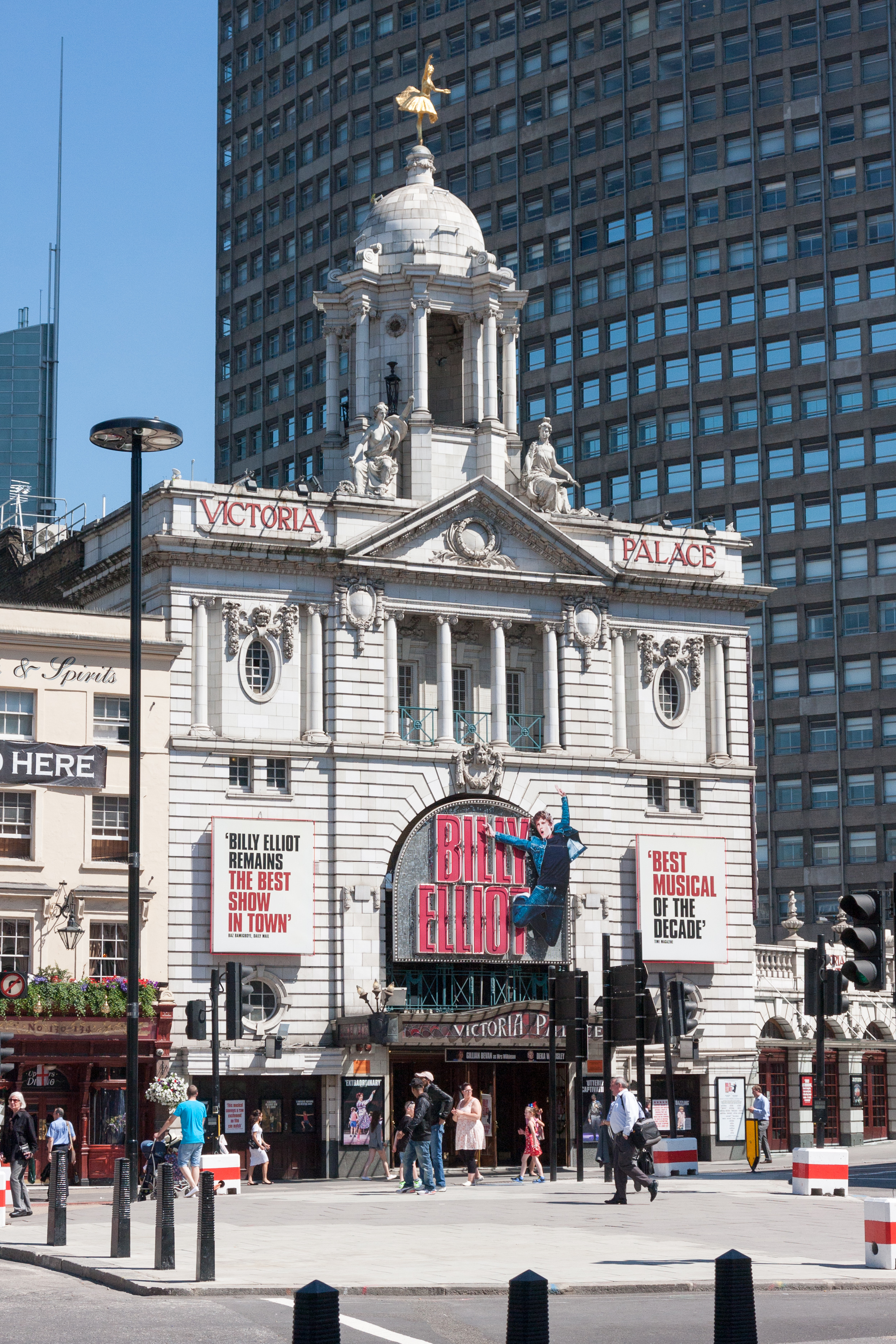
Billy Elliot playing in 2012

== Recent productions ==
- Fame (3 October 2000 – 8 September 2001) by Jacques Levy and Steve Margoshes
- Kiss Me, Kate (30 August 2001 – 24 August 2002)
- Grease (2 October 2002 – 6 September 2003) starring Ben Richards and Lee Latchford-Evans
- Tonight's the Night (7 November 2003 – 9 October 2004)
- Billy Elliot the Musical (11 May 2005 – 9 April 2016) by Lee Hall, starring Tim Healy and Haydn Gwynne.
- Hamilton (21 December 2017 – present) by Lin-Manuel Miranda

== Nearby Tube stations ==
- Victoria
