= Duchess Theatre =

West End theatre in London, England

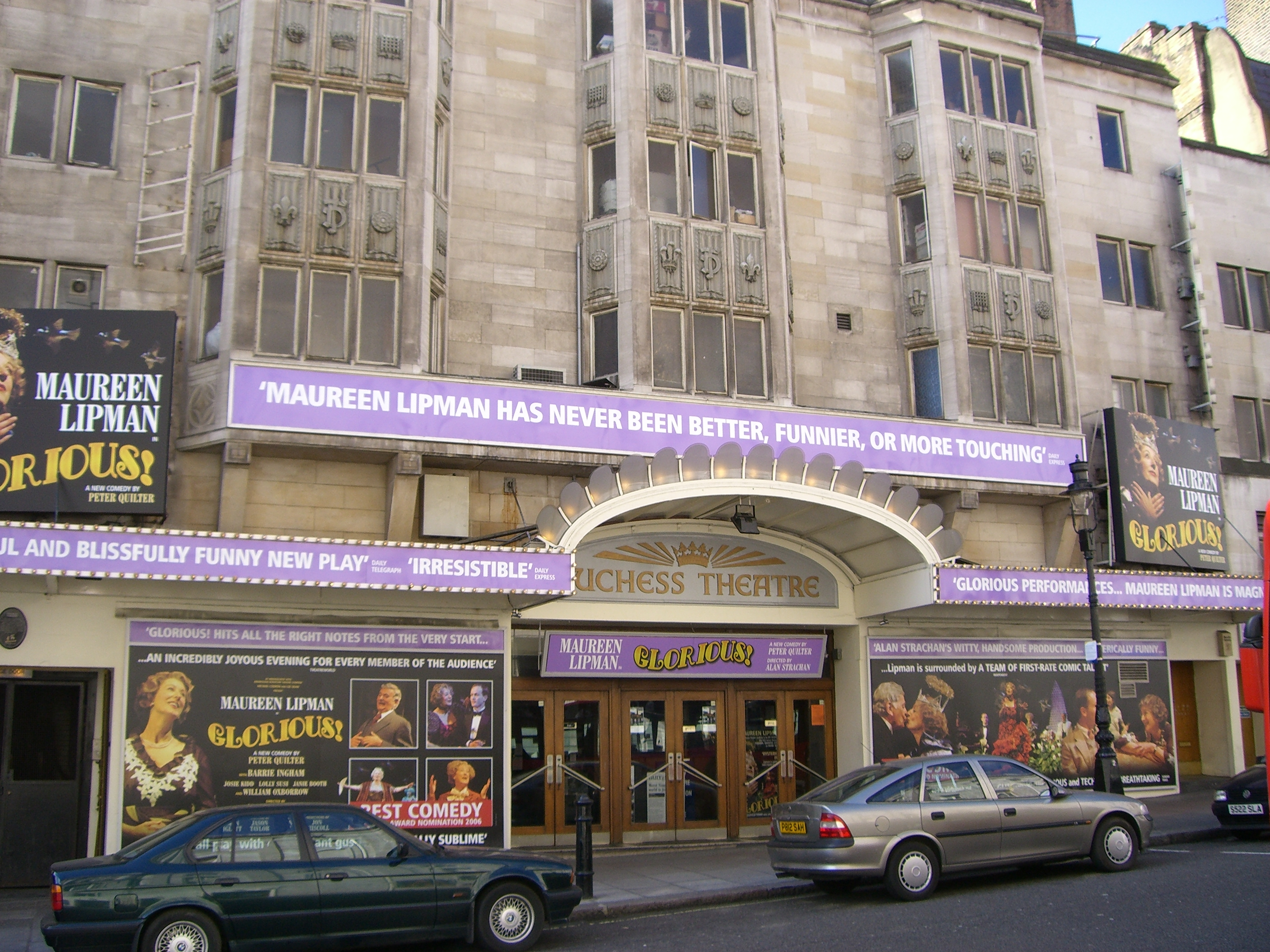
- Glorious at the Duchess Theatre in 2006
- Interactive map of Duchess Theatre
- Address: Catherine Street; London, WC2; United Kingdom
- Coordinates: 51.51226°N 0.11957°W
- Owner: Nimax Theatres
- Capacity: 494 on 2 levels
- Type: West End theatre
- Designation: Grade II
- Production: The Play That Goes Wrong
- Public transit: Covent Garden; Temple

Construction
- Opened: 25 November 1929; 96 years ago
- Architect: Ewen Barr

Website
- www.nimaxtheatres.com/nimax/duchess

The Duchess Theatre is a West End theatre in the City of Westminster, London, located in Catherine Street near Aldwych.

The theatre opened on 25 November 1929 and is one of the smallest West End theatres with a proscenium arch. It has 494 seats on two levels. It is a Grade II Listed Building.

The Duchess Theatre was purchased in 2005 by Nica Burns and Max Weitzenhoffer forming part of the Nimax Theatres group.

== History ==
The Duchess Theatre was designed by Ewen Barr and constructed by F. G. Minter Ltd for Arthur Gibbons. The theatre is built with stalls below street level, both to overcome the scale of the site and to maintain the rights of neighbours to ancient lights. The theatre opened on 25 November 1929 with a play called Tunnel Trench by Hubert Griffith. The interior decoration scheme was introduced in 1934 under the supervision of Mary Wyndham Lewis, wife of J. B. Priestley.

The original interiors were Art Deco in style, designed by Marc Henri and Gaston Laverder. These were later redesigned by Mary Wyndham-Lewis. The only remaining features of the original decorations in the auditorium are two bas-reliefs by Maurice Lambert, flanking the proscenium arch.

== Notable productions ==
- Noël Coward's Blithe Spirit, which transferred from the Piccadilly Theatre to the St. James's Theatre before moving to the Duchess Theatre where it completed a record run of 1,997 performances in 1942.
- Bill Naughton's play Alfie played at the Duchess in 1962. Famously, Lewis Gilbert saw the play and immediately contacted the writer with a view to a screen transfer.
- Tom Eyen's The Dirtiest Show in Town ran for just under 800 performances in the 1970s.
- In December 1974, Oh! Calcutta! transferred to the Duchess Theatre from the Royalty Theatre. Oh! Calcutta! remained at the Duchess until 1980.
- The Players' Theatre Company presented their Late Joys Victorian Music hall programme between 1987 and 1990.
- Marc Camoletti's Don't Dress For Dinner which transferred to the Duchess from the Apollo Theatre in October 1992 and stayed until 1 March 1997.
- The Royal Shakespeare Company's The Herbal Bed by Peter Whelan which ran for six months from April to October 1997.
- Mischief's The Play That Goes Wrong which opened in 2014 and is still running, making it the longest-running play at The Duchess Theatre since it opened in 1929.

== Production history ==
- 1929 – Opened on 25 November with Tunnel Trench, a play featuring Emlyn Williams in the cast.
- 1930 – The Duchess hosted the shortest run in West End history when The Intimate Revue closed without completing its first performance.
- 1932 – Frank Vosper starred as King Henry VIII in The Rose Without a Thorn and Jessica Tandy and Cathleen Nesbitt appeared in Christa Winsloe's Children in Uniform, directed by Leontine Sagan.
- 1933 – J B Priestley's Laburnum Grove.
- 1934 – J B Priestley joined the management of the theatre, producing his own play Eden End with Ralph Richardson.
- 1935 – Cornelius, again by Priestley and starring Richardson, and the psychological thriller Night Must Fall with Emlyn Williams as both author and star.
- 1936 – Murder in the Cathedral by T S Eliot.
- 1937 – Time and the Conways, again by Priestley. Mile Away Murder by Anthony Armstrong
- 1939 – Emlyn Williams's The Corn Is Green, starring the author and Sybil Thorndike, was playing at the time of compulsory closure due to the outbreak of war. The Playboy of the Western World.
- 1942 – Skylark with John Clements and Constance Cummings. Noël Coward's Blithe Spirit, with Margaret Rutherford, transferred from the Piccadilly Theatre to complete a run of 1,997 performances.
- 1947 – Priestley's The Linden Tree with Lewis Casson and Sybil Thorndike played 400 performances.
- 1948 – Angela Baddeley in a revival of Eden End.
- 1949 – Lewis Casson and Sybil Thorndike were re-united in The Foolish Gentlewoman.
- 1950 – The Holly and the Ivy by Wynyard Browne, featured Bryan Forbes.
- 1951 – Thora Hird and Dandy Nichols in The Happy Family.
- 1952 – Kenneth More and Peggy Ashcroft in Terence Rattigan's The Deep Blue Sea.
- 1954 – The Manor of Northstead by William Douglas Home
- 1955 – The Scandalous Affair of Mr Kettle and Mrs Moon, a comedy in three acts by J. B. Priestley.
- 1958 – The Unexpected Guest by Agatha Christie.
- 1960 – Harold Pinter's first West End success The Caretaker with Donald Pleasence and Alan Bates.
- 1960 – Go Back for Murder by Agatha Christie
- 1961 – Impresario Peter Saunders acquired the lease, coinciding with a transfer of Good Night Mrs Puffin.
- 1962 – Rule of Three by Agatha Christie.
- 1963 – Bill Naughton's Alfie and the return of Sybil Thorndike in William Douglas-Home's The Reluctant Peer.
- 1965 – The long-running Boeing Boeing transferred from the Apollo.
- 1967 – Wait Until Dark.
- 1969 – The musical Dames at Sea and The Old Ladies starring Joyce Carey, Joan Miller and Flora Robson.
- 1970 – Diana Dors in Three Months Gone.
- 1971 – The Dirtiest Show in Town.
- 1973 – Rattigan's In Praise of Love.
- 1974 – Oh! Calcutta! transferred from the Royalty and remained in residence until 1980 with a total of 3,918 performances.
- 1980 – Maria Aitken and Michael Jayston in a revival of Coward's Private Lives.
- 1984 – Snoopy!!! The Musical with Teddy Kempner and Susie Blake.
- 1985 – Dorothy Tutin and Colin Blakeley in a trio of Pinter plays called collectively Other Places.
- 1986 – The freehold of the theatre was acquired by Stoll Moss Theatres Ltd, presenting George Cole in A Month of Sundays, followed by a transfer from the Garrick of the long-running comedy No Sex Please, We're British.
- 1987 – The Players' Theatre took up residence for two and a half years while their new theatre in Villiers Street was under construction.
- 1990 – Ray Cooney's long-running farce Run for Your Wife transferred to the Duchess to complete its nine-year West End run.
- 1991 – An Evening with Gary Lineker.
- 1992 – Don't Dress for Dinner by Marc Camoletti transferred from the Apollo and kept audiences happy for a further four and a half years.
- 1997 – Maureen Lipman's one-woman show Live and Kidding was followed by the Royal Shakespeare Company's production of Peter Whelan's The Herbal Bed and the comedy whodunnit Scissor Happy.
- 1998 – Michael Williams starred as John Aubrey in the one-man play Brief Lives, Eileen Atkins and Michael Gambon played for ten weeks in the RSC's The Unexpected Man and Michael Codron and Lee Dean transferred their production of Alan Ayckbourn's Things We Do for Love from the Gielgud.
- 1999 – The National Theatre's production of Copenhagen by Michael Frayn opened with its original cast of Sara Kestelman, David Burke and Matthew Marsh.
- 2000 – In January the Duchess became a Useful Theatre when Lord Lloyd-Webber's Really Useful Group and Bridgepoint Capital purchased Stoll Moss Theatres Ltd.
- 2001 – The auditorium was transformed to recreate the Cottesloe in the round layout for Blue/Orange by Joe Penhall, with Bill Nighy and the original National Theatre cast. This was followed by the Irish comedy Alone it Stands.
- 2002 – Life After George with Stephen Dillane. The Glee Club and David Hare returned to the West End with Via Dolorosa before the opening of Alan Ayckbourn's Damsels in Distress.
- 2003 – The year started with Gyles Brandreth's Zipp! Through the Leaves and Harold Pinter's Betrayal.
- 2004 – Hershey Felder as George Gershwin Alone. Coyote on a Fence and Novel Theatre Company's adaptation of Little Women.
- 2005 – David Suchet in Man and Boy by Terence Rattigan, The Birthday Party revived with Eileen Atkins and Henry Goodman, and Maureen Lipman in Glorious by Peter Quilter.
- 2006 – Stones in His Pockets by Marie Jones, starring Conrad Kemp and John Cronin.
- 2007 – The musical Buddy – The Buddy Holly Story.
- 2009 – Plague Over England with Michael Feast and Celia Imrie, Collaboration and Taking Sides, with Michael Pennington and David Horowitz, and Endgame with Mark Rylance, Simon McBurney, Miriam Margolyes and Tom Hickey.
- 2010 – Morecambe starring Bob Golding, Ghosts starring Lesley Sharp, The Fantasticks, and Krapp's Last Tape starring Michael Gambon.
- 2011 – Simon Gray's Butley starring Dominic West and Paul McGann, Ruby Wax: Losing It, and The Pitmen Painters.
- 2012 – The RSC's Written on the Heart, The Hurly Burly Show, Our Boys starring Laurence Fox and Arthur Darvill.
- 2013 – Alan Bennett's Untold Stories starring Alex Jennings, August Wilson's Fences starring Lenny Henry and Bertolt Brecht's The Resistible Rise of Arturo Ui starring Henry Goodman.
- 2014 – Bakersfield Mist starring Kathleen Turner, then The Play That Goes Wrong (Winner of the 2015 Olivier Award for Best New Comedy and Best New Comedy at the WhatsOnStage.com Awards in 2014. Written by the Mischief Theatre Company)

== See also ==
- List of London theatres
- List of West End musicals
- List of notable musical theatre productions
- Musical theatre
