= Nimax Theatres =

Theatre group

- Company type: Private
- Industry: Theatre
- Genre: Theatre
- Founded: 2005
- Founder: Nica Burns & Max Weitzenhoffer
- Headquarters: London, United Kingdom
- Owner: Nica Burns & Max Weitzenhoffer
- Website: https://nimaxtheatres.com/

Nimax Theatres is a theatre group owned and operated by Nica Burns and Max Weitzenhoffer.

== History ==
In July 2005, Weitzenhoffer and Burns announced they were forming Nimax to buy four of London’s playhouses from Andrew Lloyd Webber, namely the Apollo Theatre, Garrick Theatre, Duchess Theatre and Lyric Theatre, taking control the following October. Additionally, Weitzenhoffer had already owned the Vaudeville Theatre since January 2001; it was transferred in September 2005 to the newly formed company.

In April 2012, Nimax purchased the Palace Theatre from Lloyd Webber.

In Autumn 2022, Nimax opened @sohoplace, the first newly-built West End theatre to open in 50 years

== Theatres ==
The group owns and operates seven West End theatres:

- Apollo Theatre
- Duchess Theatre
- Garrick Theatre
- Lyric Theatre
- Palace Theatre
- Vaudeville Theatre
- @sohoplace
