= Delfont Mackintosh Theatres =

London theatre group

- Company type: Private
- Industry: Theatre
- Genre: Theatre
- Founded: 1991
- Founder: Cameron Mackintosh and Bernard Delfont
- Headquarters: London
- Owner: Cameron Mackintosh
- Website: www.delfontmackintosh.co.uk

Delfont Mackintosh Theatres is a theatre group owned by British theatrical producer Cameron Mackintosh. The company was founded in 1991 by Mackintosh and Bernard Delfont when Mackintosh acquired part ownership of the theatre holdings of First Leisure Corporation. The group owns eight London theatres.

== Theatres ==
- Gielgud Theatre (leased 1999, acquired 2002 from Christ's Hospital, began operating 2006)
- Noël Coward Theatre (leased 1999 from Gascoyne Holdings, began operating 2005)
- Novello Theatre (acquired 1991, began operating 2003)
- Prince Edward Theatre (acquired 1991 from First Leisure)
- Prince of Wales Theatre (acquired 1991 from First Leisure)
- Sondheim Theatre (leased 1999, acquired 2002 from Christ's Hospital, began operating 2004)
- Victoria Palace Theatre (acquired 2014 from Stephen Waley-Cohen)
- Wyndham's Theatre (leased 1999 from Gascoyne Holdings, began operating 2005)
