= David Learner =

British actor (born 1955)

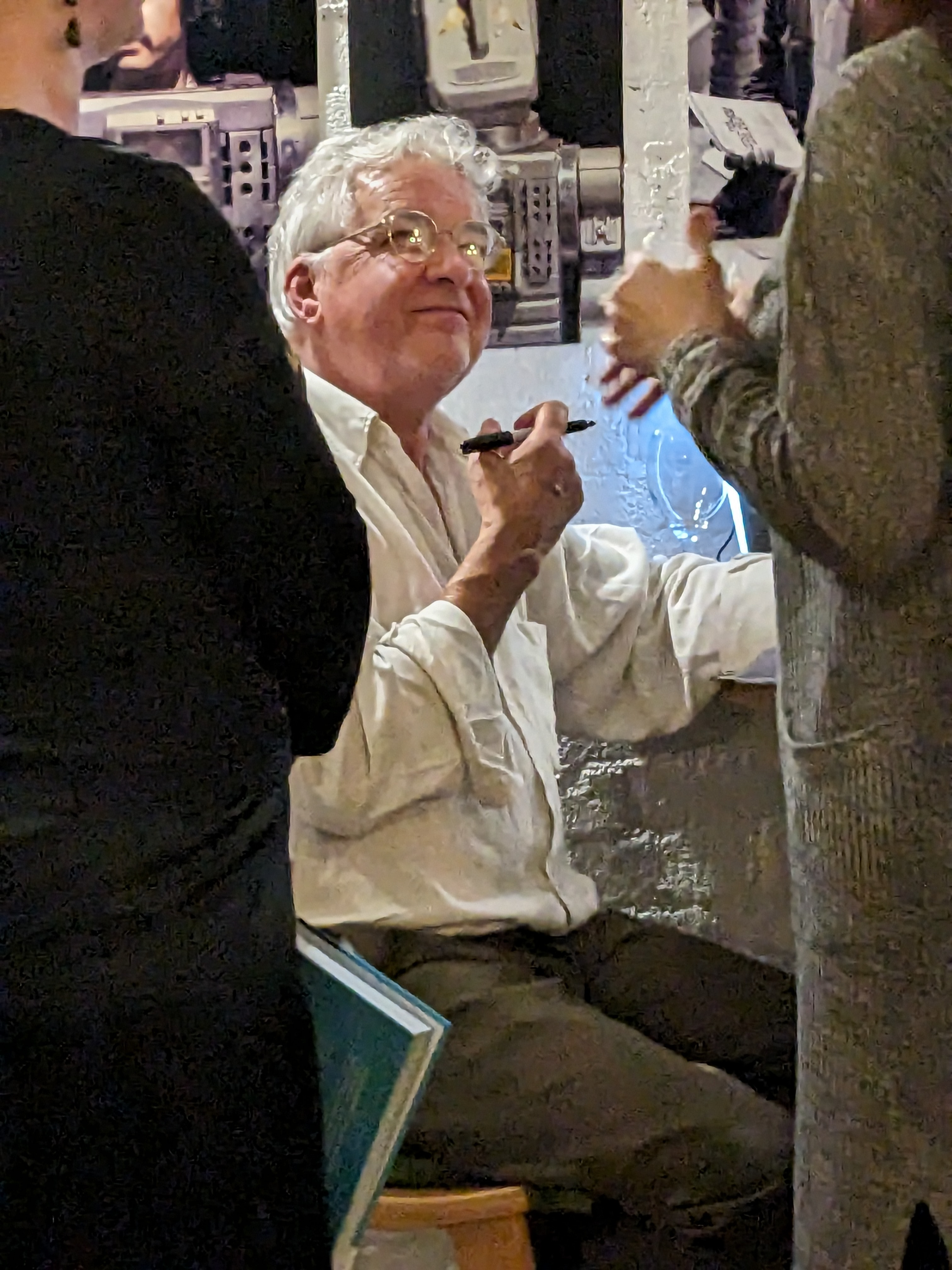
- Learner in 2023
- Born: David Francis Somerville Learner; 23 August 1955 (age 71); Hammersmith, London, England
- Occupations: Actor, Writer
- Years active: 1976–present

David Francis Somerville Learner (born 23 August 1955 in Hammersmith, London) is a British actor who is best known for playing Marvin the Paranoid Android in The Hitchhiker's Guide to the Galaxy and Pickle in the CITV adventure game show Knightmare. He studied at RADA alongside Alan Rickman and Trevor Eve and has appeared in numerous stage plays and radio productions.

== Career ==
He played Marvin for two national tours of The Hitchhiker's Guide to the Galaxy including the Rainbow Theatre in 1980 and at the opening of the Drum Theatre, Plymouth in 1982. He also appeared in the 1981 BBC TV adaptation, but only in costume providing the movements for Marvin. Stephen Moore, who played him on the radio series, was brought back to provide the voice. Learner later appeared in the documentary "The Making of Hitchhiker's Guide to the Galaxy" (1993) to reminisce about the filming of the show.

In 1990 he appeared in The Satellite Game (38 episodes) for BSB, playing the host Larry the Robot. It was during this time that he met Knightmare producer Tim Child for the first time, which led to a successful audition for the role of Pickle. Learner later said in an interview, "I thought I was only going to do one series, I ended up staying for three."

Learner played the wood elf Pickle on Knightmare from Series 4 to 6 (47 episodes, 1990-1992). His role was to help out teams and to provide comic relief. Pickle sometimes broke the rules, by sneaking food into the Dungeoneers Knapsack and famously stepped into the game during one episode to fend off an enemy attack against a contestant, which infuriated Treguard (played by Hugo Myatt). After leaving the series, his part was replaced with a female Arabian genie called Majida played by actress Jackie Sawiris. In 1997 he played the villain Belial in the video game Realms of the Haunting, and appeared in The Famous Five episode "Five Have a Wonderful Time" playing Alfredo, the Fire Eater.

Learner retired from acting in 1999. In 2001 he presented a Sunday afternoon show on X-CEL FM (before it was renamed Star 107.9). He pursued a career in sales and marketing and became a marketing executive for Alliance in Bury St Edmunds. On Sky 1 in 2004 Marvin the Paranoid Android came 7th in a poll counting down the "Top Ten Sci-Fi Robots", Learner was interviewed for it along with actors such as Robert Llewellyn (Kryten) and John Leeson (K-9). On 9 May 2013, he appeared in a Script in Hand performance of "The Beau Defeated" by Mary Pix as part of the Restoring the Repertoire project run by the Theatre Royal, Bury St Edmunds. He played the part of Mr Rich.

In 2017, Learner provided the voice of Cyril the Farmbot and the narrator in a live-action pitch trailer for 'Minding Mama', a comic book series written by EJ Jackson and illustrated by Dan Schaefer. He appeared in a pantomime about Dick Whittington and His Cat in 2023.

== Filmography ==
=== Television ===
Year	Title	Role	Notes
1977	Esther Waters	Jackie	Episode: #1.4
1981	The Hitchhiker's Guide to the Galaxy	Marvin	4 episodes
1983	West Country Tales	Husband	Episode: "The Little Bounder"
1990–1992	Knightmare	Pickle	47 episodes
1997	The Famous Five	Mr. Alfredo	2 episodes

=== Video games ===
Year	Title	Role	Notes
1996	Realms of the Haunting	Belial	
2021	The Dark Side of the Moon	Dr. Bernard Harper	Voice
