= Jordan Radio and Television Corporation =

State broadcaster of Jordan

مؤسسة الإذاعة والتلفزيون الأردني Jordan Radio and Television Corporation
- Type: Broadcast radio, television and online
- Country: Jordan
- Availability: Worldwide
- Founded: 27 April 1968; 58 years ago
- Owner: Government of Jordan
- Former names: Jordan Television Corporation (JTV)
- Official website: jrtv.jo (in Arabic)
- Replaced: Jordan Radio; Jordan Television

Jordan Radio and Television Corporation (JRTV) is the state broadcaster of Jordan. It was formed in 1985 after the merger between Jordan Radio and Jordan Television.

Jordan's first radio broadcasts were received from other countries in the Middle East. Initially known as Transjordan, it did not adopt a radio service of its own until 1948. Radio Jordan first broadcast in 1956. Today it broadcasts a 24-hour Arabic service, as well as an English language service for 21 hours per day and a French language service for 13 hours per day.

The main channel for JRTV is its satellite channel, called Al-Urdunniyya (Arabic: الأردنية), meaning 'the Jordanian' [channel].

== History ==
A television service was initially due in 1963.

Black-and-white television broadcasting in Jordan started in April 1968 from one studio, with three hours of programming. It started as JTV (Jordan Television Corporation) and received support from a US advisor, RTV International, which outbid the BBC. Many Israelis watched American programs on Jordanian broadcasts.

JTV was admitted as a full active member of the European Broadcasting Union in 1970. The following years witnessed several milestones for JTV. In 1972, it became the first station in the region to operate a second channel, Channel 2, which specialised in foreign programmes, including a news bulletin in English. In 1974, JTV started transmission in full colours using the PAL system, and in 1975, transmission was expanded to cover the entire Kingdom. The first face of JTV was Ghada Haddadin, who later acted as the anchor for English news.

Notorious was JTV's censorship of the 1978 Eurovision Song Contest, which saw Izhar Cohen's song A-Ba-Ni-Bi being replaced by static photos of daffodils, due to supposed "technical problems". The channel also ended its broadcast when it became apparent that Israel was going to win the contest, by cutting earlier and saying that Belgium won the contest instead. Along with the English programmes on Channel 2, JTV started transmission of French news bulletins and programmes in 1978.

In 1985, Jordan Radio and Jordan Television merged to form Jordan Radio and Television Corporation (JRTV).

Amra Satellite Earth Station was established in 1988 and was linked to the satellites: Eutelsat, Intelsat and Arabsat.

In 1993, the Jordan Satellite Channel was launched and in 1998, a third channel was launched, Channel 3, which was devoted to transmitting the Parliamentary sessions and local and international sports.

In January 2001, the corporation underwent major restructuring. Programmes of Channel 1 and 2 were combined in one main channel. Channel 2 specialised in sports, while Channel 3 was operated in cooperation with the private sector, on the basis of two transmission periods: the morning and afternoon "Cartoon Channel" and the evening "Jordan Movie Channel".

Al-Urdunniyya can be viewed through live streaming online at jrtv.jo.

== Services ==
JRTV operates three television channels and four radio stations throughout the country:

=== Radio stations ===
- Jordanian Radio (Radio al-Urdunniyah) – generalist national radio station
- Radio Amman FM – a station with a specific focus on Amman, the capital of Jordan; Irbid has a local version of this station
- Radio Jordan – foreign music and programming in English or French, depending on the time of day; broadcasting in English since 1973 (initially on medium wave, then FM since 1994) and in French since 1992
- Holy Quran Radio

=== Television channels ===
- Jordan TV
- Sport TV
- Al Ordoniyah

== List of programmes ==
=== Foreign ===
==== Drama ====
- (United States) The Adventures of Brisco County, Jr.
- (Canada) (France) (New Zealand) The Adventures of the Black Stallion
- (Australia) Against the Wind
- (United States) Airwolf
- (Australia) All the Rivers Run
- (United Kingdom) Angels
- (United Kingdom) Anna Karenina
- (United Kingdom) Anna of the Five Towns
- (United States) Babylon 5
- (United States) Battlestar Galactica
- (United States) Beauty and the Beast
- (United States) Blacke's Magic
- (Australia) Blue Heelers
- (Canada) (France) Bordertown
- (United Kingdom) Bugs
- (United Kingdom) Campaign
- (United Kingdom) Chancer
- (United Kingdom) The Charmer
- (United States) China Beach
- (India) Circus
- (United States) The Commish
- (United Kingdom) The Contract
- (New Zealand) Cover Story
- (United Kingdom) Covington Cross
- (United States) Cosby Mysteries
- (United Kingdom) Crown Court
- (United States) Delvecchio
- (United Kingdom) Dickens of London
- (United Kingdom) Doctor Who
- (United States) Dr. Quinn, Medicine Woman
- (United Kingdom) The Duchess of Duke Street
- (Australia) G.P.
- (United Kingdom) Enemy at the Door
- (United States) The Equalizer
- (United States) ER
- (United Kingdom) Forever Green
- (United Kingdom) Game, Set and Match
- (United Kingdom) Gone to the Dogs
- (United Kingdom) The Guilty
- (Australia) Halifax f.p.
- (United States) Hawaii 5-O
- (France) (Canada) Highlander: The Series
- (United Kingdom) The History of Tom Jones: a Foundling
- (United States) Hooperman
- (United States) Hunter
- (United Kingdom) Inspector Morse
- (United Kingdom) Jamaica Inn
- (France) Le chevalier de Pardaillan (In French)
- (South Africa) Legend of the Hidden City
- (United States) Lois & Clark: The New Adventures of Superman
- (United States) L.A. Law
- (United Kingdom) Made in Heaven
- (United Kingdom) Madson
- (United States) Miami Vice
- (United States) Mrs. Columbo
- (United States) Murder, She Wrote
- (United States) M.A.N.T.I.S.
- (United Kingdom) (Canada) (France) The New Avengers
- (Canada) North of 60
- (United States) NYPD Blue
- (United States) Ohara
- (United States) Rags to Riches
- (United States) Remington Steele
- (United States) Renegade
- (United States) Rich Man, Poor Man
- (United States) Roots
- (France) Rue Carnot (In French)
- (United States) Sea Hunt
- (United Kingdom) Secret Army
- (United States) Sins
- (United Kingdom) Space Precinct
- (United States) Space Rangers
- (United States) Star Trek: The Next Generation
- (Australia) Tanamera – Lion of Singapore
- (United States) (Australia) Time Trax
- (United States) Turks
- (United Kingdom) A Very British Coup
- (United Kingdom) Wish Me Luck
- (United States) The X-Files
- (United States) The Waltons
- (Australia) Which Way Home
- (Canada) Wind at My Back

==== Children's ====
- (United States) The Adventures of Mickey and Donald
- (Canada) The Adventures of Shirley Holmes
- (United States) (Canada) The Adventures of Teddy Ruxpin
- (Australia) The Adventures of the Bush Patrol
- (Japan) Adventures on Rainbow Pond
- (United States) Aladdin
- (United States) Animaniacs
- (United Kingdom) (France) The Animals of Farthing Wood
- (Australia) Animal Park
- (Soviet Union) (United States) Animated Classic Showcase
- (United States) At the Zoo
- (United States) Back to the Future
- (Australia) Bananas in Pyjamas
- (United States) Barney & Friends
- (United States) Batman: The Animated Series
- (United States) Beakman's World
- (United States) Beethoven
- (United States) Bill Nye, the Science Guy
- (Canada) Blizzard Island
- (United States) Bonkers
- (Japan) Bosco Adventure (In French)
- (France) Bouli (In French)
- (New Zealand) (Canada) The Boy from Andromeda
- (United Kingdom) Budgie the Little Helicopter
- (South Africa) Bush School
- (United States) Captain Planet and the Planeteers
- (France) (United States) Care Bears
- (France) Caroline and Her Friends (In French)
- (Canada) (France) Cat Tales (In French)
- (United Kingdom) Chorlton and the Wheelies
- (United Kingdom) Chris Cross
- (France) Clémentine (In French)
- (United States) Cro
- (Australia) The Curiosity Show
- (Australia) (New Zealand) (France) Deepwater Haven
- (United States) (France) Dennis the Menace
- (United States) (France) Denver, the Last Dinosaur (In French)
- (Australia) Dinky Di's
- (United States) (Canada) Dog City
- (Canada) Dog House
- (United States) Double Dragon
- (United States) Droopy, Master Detective
- (Australia) Elly & Jools
- (Australia) Escape from Jupiter
- (United Kingdom) The Famous Five
- (France) Fantômette (In French)
- (United States) (Canada) Fievel's American Tails
- (Wales) Fireman Sam
- (United States) The Flintstones
- (United States) Freakazoid!
- (Australia) (United Kingdom) The Genie From Down Under
- (United States) Ghostwriter
- (Australia) Halfway Across the Galaxy and Turn Left
- (United States) Hammerman
- (United States) (France) (Canada) Heathcliff (In Arabic)
- (United Kingdom) Here Comes Mumfie
- (United States) The Huggabug Club
- (United Kingdom) (United States) (Scotland) Hurricanes
- (United States) The Incredible Hulk and She-Hulk
- (United States) (France) (Canada) Inspector Gadget
- (Canada) Iris, The Happy Professor
- (United States) Jim Henson's Animal Show
- (Wales) Joshua Jones
- (United States) Jonny Quest
- (Australia) Kelly
- (France) Le Chevalier Du Labyrinthe (In French)
- (France) Le Monde Magique De Chantal Coya (In French)
- (United Kingdom) The Legends of Treasure Island
- (Japan) Leo the Lion
- (France) Les Badaboks (In French)
- (Australia) Lift Off
- (United States) The Little Mermaid
- (Canada) (United States) Little Rosey
- (France) (Belgium) (United States) Lucky Luke
- (United States) Mac and Muttley
- (Australia) (China) Magic Mountain
- (United States) (Canada) The Magic School Bus
- (United States) Madeline
- (Japan) The Many Dream Journeys of Meme (In French)
- (United States) Masters of the Maze
- (United States) The Mask: Animated Series
- (France) Michel Vaillant (In French)
- (France) Micro Kids (In French)
- (Australia) (New Zealand) Mirror, Mirror
- (United States) Moby Dick and Mighty Mightor
- (Japan) Moero! Top Striker (In French)
- (France) Molierissimo (In French)
- (Japan) (Netherlands) (Finland) (Sweden) Moomin
- (United States) Mother Goose and Grimm
- (United States) Mr. Bogus
- (Japan) My Favorite Fairy Tales
- (Canada) My Life as a Dog
- (Canada) My Secret Identity
- (United States) The New Fred and Barney Show
- (United States) New Kids on the Block
- (United States) The New 3 Stooges
- (New Zealand) Night of the Red Hunter
- (United Kingdom) (Canada) (United States) Noddy in Toyland
- (United Kingdom) Noddy's Toyland Adventures
- (Australia) Ocean Girl
- (Canada) The Odyssey
- (United Kingdom) (France) Oscar's Orchestra
- (Canada) (Belgium) Ovide and the Gang
- (United States) The Pebbles and Bamm-Bamm Show
- (United States) The Pink Panther
- (United Kingdom) Pirates
- (United Kingdom) Postman Pat
- (United States) Problem Child
- (Australia) Pugwall's Summer
- (South Africa) Pumpkin Patch
- (Canada) The Raccoons (In French)
- (United Kingdom) Rainbow
- (United States) Raw Toonage
- (United States) Read Alee Deed Alee
- (Canada) (United States) ReBoot
- (United States) Richie Rich
- (Canada) Road to Avonlea
- (United Kingdom) (Canada) Rotten Ralph
- (Spain) Sandokan
- (United Kingdom) The Scientific Eye
- (United States) The Secret World of Alex Mack
- (United Kingdom) See How They Grow
- (United States) Shelley Duvall's Bedtime Stories
- (South Africa) Shingalana the Little Hunter
- (Germany) The Show with the Mouse
- (United States) Sinbad Jr. and his Magic Belt
- (Australia) Skippy the Bush Kangaroo
- (Australia) Sky Trackers
- (Canada) (France) The Smoggies (In French)
- (United States) (Belgium) Snorks (In French)
- (France) Spartakus and the Sun Beneath the Sea (In French)
- (United Kingdom) Spatz
- (Canada) Spirit Bay
- (Japan) Speed Racer
- (Australia) (Poland) Spellbinder
- (France) Spiff and Hercules (In French)
- (France) (Canada) Spirou (In English and French)
- (United States) Square One Television
- (United States) Standby...Lights! Camera! Action!
- (United Kingdom) Super Champs
- (United States) Super Dave: Daredevil for Hire
- (United States) Superman: The Animated Series
- (United States) TaleSpin
- (United States) Teenage Mutant Ninja Turtles (In French)
- (United States) Terrytoons
- (United Kingdom) Time Riders
- (United States) (South Korea) Twinkle the Dream Being
- (Japan) Uchūsen Sagittarius (In French)
- (United States) Ultimate Spider-Man
- (United States) Vid Kids
- (United Kingdom) Vision On
- (Australia) The Wayne Manifesto
- (United States) What Would You Do?
- (United States) Wild West C.O.W.-Boys of Moo Mesa
- (United States) Wish Kid
- (United States) Wishbone
- (Canada) Wonder Why?
- (United States) Woody Woodpecker
- (United Kingdom) The World of Peter Rabbit and Friends
- (Australia) The Worst Day of My Life
- (Japan) (United States) (Netherlands) Wowser (In Arabic)

==== News ====
- (France) Envoyé spécial (In French)
- (France) Regarde le Monde (In French)

==== Talk shows ====
- (Canada) Bêtes pas bêtes (In French)

==== Anthology ====
- (United States) Alfred Hitchcock Presents
- (United States) The Twilight Zone

==== Music ====
- (France) Embarquement immédiat (In French)
- (France) Taratata (In French)

==== Comedy ====
- (United Kingdom) 2point4 Children
- (United States) The 5 Mrs. Buchanans
- (Australia) Acropolis Now
- (United Kingdom) Are You Being Served?
- (United States) Big Brother Jake
- (United Kingdom) The Brittas Empire
- (United States) Caroline in the City
- (United States) Charles in Charge
- (United States) Charlie Chaplin
- (Canada) Check It Out!
- (United States) The Cosby Show
- (United Kingdom) Dad's Army
- (United Kingdom) Devenish
- (United States) Diff'rent Strokes
- (United States) Dinosaurs
- (United States) Double Trouble
- (United States) Dudley
- (United States) Ellen
- (United States) Empty Nest
- (United Kingdom) Executive Stress
- (United States) Evening Shade
- (United Kingdom) Ever Decreasing Circles
- (United States) Everybody Loves Raymond
- (United States) Family Matters
- (United Kingdom) Fawlty Towers
- (United States) The Fresh Prince of Bel-Air
- (United States) Friends
- (United States) The Golden Girls
- (United Kingdom) The Good Life
- (United States) Grace Under Fire
- (United States) Here's Lucy
- (Australia) Hey Dad..!
- (United States) House Calls
- (United States) I Dream of Jeannie
- (United States) I Married Dora
- (United States) Just the Ten of Us
- (United States) Kate & Allie
- (United Kingdom) Keeping Up Appearances
- (United States) Laff-a-Bits
- (France) L'appart (In French)
- (United Kingdom) The Many Wives of Patrick
- (United States) The Mighty Jungle
- (United States) Mork & Mindy
- (Australia) Mother and Son
- (United States) Mr. Belvedere
- (United States) The Munsters Today
- (United States) (United Kingdom) The Muppet Show
- (United States) Murphy Brown
- (United States) The Nanny
- (Australia) Newlyweds
- (United Kingdom) No Job for a Lady
- (United Kingdom) No Place Like Home
- (United Kingdom) One Foot in the Grave
- (United Kingdom) Open All Hours
- (United States) Parenthood
- (United States) Perfect Strangers
- (United Kingdom) Robin's Nest
- (United States) Saved by the Bell
- (United States) The Simpsons
- (United States) Sparks
- (United States) Step by Step
- (United States) Suddenly Susan
- (United Kingdom) Three Up, Two Down
- (United States) Three's Company
- (United States) Throb
- (United States) Too Close for Comfort
- (United States) The Torkelsons
- (United States) Who's the Boss?
- (United Kingdom) Yes Minister

==== Soap opera ====
- (United States) The Bold and the Beautiful
- (United States) Dallas
- (United States) Falcon Crest
- (Australia) Neighbours
- (United States) The Young and the Restless (In Arabic)

==== Variety ====
- (France) Champs-Élysées (In French)
- (France) Un DB de plus (In French)

==== Sports ====
- (United States) The Spectacular World of Guinness Records

==== Game shows ====
- (United Kingdom) The Crystal Maze
- (France) The Desert Forges
- (France) Des chiffres et des lettres (In French)
- (France) Fort Boyard (In French)
- (France) L'École des fans (In French)
- (United Kingdom) Small Talk
- (United Kingdom) Take Your Pick!
- (United Kingdom) Treasure Hunt
- (United States) You Bet Your Life

==== Documentary ====
- (France) Allo La Terre (In French)
- (United States) Ancient Voices
- (United Kingdom) Big Cat Diary
- (Canada) Enigma
- (France) E=M6 (In French)
- (United States) In Search of...
- (United States) Life After People
- (United States) Life Choices
- (United States) Mothers of the Wild
- (South Africa) Shall Never Lose Hope
- (United States) (United Kingdom) (Soviet Union) The Unknown War
- (France) Ushuaïa (In French)
- (United Kingdom) Walking with Dinosaurs

==== Reality ====
- (United States) The Oprah Winfrey Show

==== Western ====
- (United States) Dr. Quinn, Medicine Woman
- (United States) The Lazarus Man
- (United States) Lonesome Dove

==== Magazine ====
- (Australia) The Album Show
- (United Kingdom) Movies, Games and Videos

== See also ==
- Shababnews
