= Jackie Sawiris =

- Occupations: Actress; director; producer; writer
- Years active: 1988–present
- Website: jackiesawiris.com

Jackie Sawiris is a Jordanian/Egyptian actress, writer and film-maker who is best known for playing the Arabian genie Majida in Knightmare from 1993 to 1994. Other notable performances include playing Roz in Eyes Wide Shut (1999).

== Acting career ==
Her character in Knightmare was Sawiris's breakthrough role, she appeared in the show for 2 years until the series ended in 1994, replacing actor David Learner who played the wood elf Pickle. Her role in the series was to provide some comic relief, Majida would often summon the Dungeoneers in herself and in Episode 1 of Season 7 she changes the original horned Helmet of Justice for a new one (complete with a visor), much to the annoyance of Treguard (Hugo Myatt).

Selected other film and TV Credits include 45 Minutes to Ramallah (2013), Incendies (2010), 10 Days to War (2008), The Bill (1998), The Big Swap (1998), Emmerdale (4 episodes in 1998), the video game Krazy Ivan (1995) and Death Machine (1994).

== Producer/director ==
Since 1988 Sawiris has worked behind the camera as a director and producer on many Film & TV Productions. She was assistant director (1st AD/2nd Unit) on The Mummy Returns (2001). She was also a production secretary on 12 episodes of The Wire in 2003.

She is currently working on a selection of projects and films, some written, directed and starring herself.

== Filmography ==
=== Television ===
Year	Title	Role	Notes
1993–1994	Knightmare	Majida	25 episodes
1998	Emmerdale	Beth Williams	4 episodes
1998	The Bill	Maria Joliffe	2 episodes
2003	The Wire	TV Reporter	Episode: "Bad Dreams"
2006	The Holy Family	Mary of Clopas	Television film
2008	10 Days to War	Somaiya	Episode: "You Are Welcome Here"
2008	The Shooting of Thomas Hurndall	Taysir's Mother	Television film

=== Film ===
Year	Title	Role	Notes
1991	New York Vampire	Miranda	
1994	Death Machine	Waitress	
1997	Table 5	Ramona	
1998	The Big Swap	Sydney	
1999	Eyes Wide Shut	Roz	
2010	Incendies	Mére	
2010	SenseLess	Kalthoum	Short film
2011	Kelling Brae	Ellen Marchant	
2013	45 Minutes to Ramallah	Mama	

=== Video games ===
Year	Title	Role	Notes
1996	Krazy Ivan	Fatima	
