= Wyvern Theatre =

Theatre in Swindon, Wiltshire, England

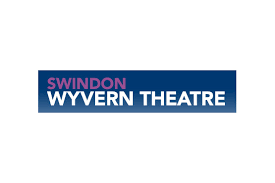

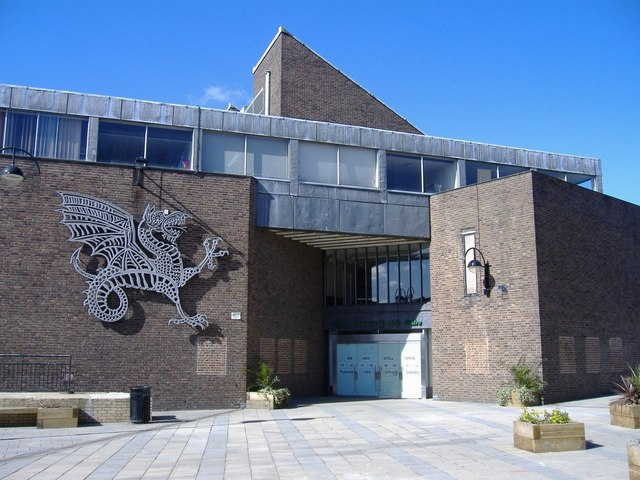
- Interactive map of Wyvern Theatre
- Address: Theatre Square; Swindon; England
- Coordinates: 51.558°N 1.783°W
- Capacity: 635

Construction
- Built: 1968–1971
- Opened: 7 September 1971
- Closed: 3 September 2006 – 25 September 2007; March 2020 – 2021
- Reopened: 25 September 2007; Between August and September 2021

Website
- trafalgartickets.com/wyvern-theatre-swindon/en-GB

The Wyvern Theatre is a 635-seat indoor auditorium in Swindon, England, opened in September 1971. It is owned by Swindon Borough Council and operated by Trafalgar Entertainment.

In March 2019, Swindon Borough Council stated the building was likely to reach the end of its life by 2027, when its operations contract ends. Representative Dale Heenan cautioned that structural and maintenance reports showed the theatre required major investment.

In November 2023, the authority suggested the site of a new venue could be the town's bus station, as it was slated for demolition. In September 2024, proposals were released for a new multi-purpose theatre with increased capacity on the bus station site. Proposals have outlined that the existing Wyvern Theatre will be retained, but repurposed as a performing space for community arts groups.

== History ==
The theatre was built in 1968–71 by Casson, Conder and Partners as part of Swindon Civic Centre. It is named after the mythical wyvern which was once the emblem of the kings of Wessex.

The building was opened on 7 September 1971 by Queen Elizabeth II and Prince Philip. The first performance was by a Ukrainian dance company.

On 3 September 2006, it closed temporarily after the discovery of traces of asbestos in the venue's offices and roof void during a routine inspection. It remained closed until September 2007 and the opportunity was taken to refurbish the venue, bringing new decor, bars, cafés, disabled entrances and new seating at a total cost of £1.3 million. In March 2020, the venue closed again temporarily due to the COVID-19 pandemic, remaining closed until between August and September 2021.

The Wyvern was one of 11 venues in England managed by HQ Theatres, a company which was acquired by Trafalgar Entertainment in March 2021.

== Management companies ==
- 1971–1994 – Wyvern Arts Trust Ltd
- 1994–2001 – Apollo Leisure – General Manager Ted Doan
- 2001–2002 – SFX Venues – General Manager Ted Doan
- 2002–2005 – Clear Channel Entertainment – General Manager Ted Doan, Andrew Lister
- 2005–2007 – Hetherington Seelig Theatres Ltd. – General Manager Nick Shaw, Darren Edwards, Andrew Hill
- 2007–2021 – HQ Theatres, a joint venture between H.S.T Ltd and Qdos Entertainment – Theatre Director Derek Aldridge, Laura James
- Since 2021 – Trafalgar Entertainment - Theatre Director Laura James

== Pantomimes ==
- 1971/72 – Dick Whittington and His Cat
- 1972/73 – Cinderella starring Howell Evans and Sue Holderness
- 1973/74 – Dick Whittington starring Ian Lavender and Helen Shapiro
- 1974/75 – Aladdin
- 1975/76 – Mother Goose starring Patsy Blower
- 1976/77 – Snow White and the Seven Dwarfs
- 1977/78 – Jack and the Beanstalk starring Tony Brandon
- 1978/79 – Cinderella
- 1979/80 – Jack and the Beanstalk
- 1980/81 – No pantomime due to AIDS
- 1981/82 – Aladdin starring Bernie Winters and Tim Swinton, Jackie Pallo, Jimmy Thompson and Anne Sidney
- 1982/83 – Babes in the Wood Starring Jess Conrad (Robin Hood) & Norman Vaughan (Merry Norman)
- 1983/84 – No pantomime due to AIDS
- 1984/85 – Cinderella starring Sheila Harrod (Dandini) Roger Dean (Ugly Sister Ruby) Don Crann (Ugly Sister Sal) and April Walker (Prince Charming)
- 1985/86 – Aladdin starring David Griffin (Wishee Washee) & Don Crann (Widow Twanky)
- 1986/87 – Jack and the Beanstalk starring Johnny Ball
- 1987/88 – Babes in the Wood starring Peter Duncan (Silly Billy) & Bruce Montague (Sheriff of Nottingham) & Pollyann Tanner (Maid Marion)
- 1988/89 – Dick Whittington starring Andrew O'Connor (Idle Jack), Michael Groth (Dick Whittington) & Peter Denyer (King Rat)
- 1989/90 – Mother Goose – Starring Adam Woodyatt (Silly Billy) and Chris Harris with Terry Hall and Lenny the Lion

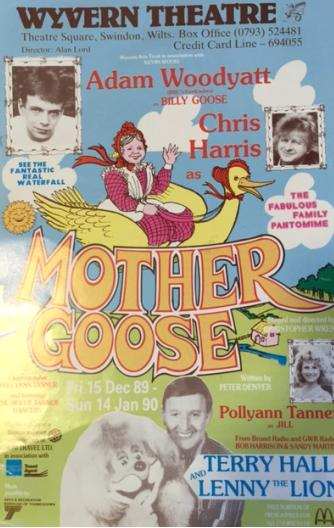
Adam Woodyatt and Lenny the Lion Wyvern Panto flyer

- 1990/91 – Aladdin – Starring Floella Benjamin (Aladdin) and Bobby Gee

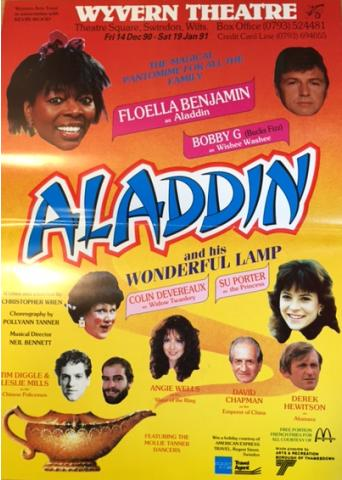
Floella Benjamin Panto flyer

- 1991/92 – Cinderella – Starring Matthew Kelly (Buttons)
- 1992/93 – Jack and the Beanstalk – Starring Trevor Bannister (Dame Trott) Mark Franklin (Jack) Hugo Myatt (Igor the Henchman) & Scarlott O'Neal (Jill)
- 1993/94 – Snow White and the Seven Dwarfs – Starring Brian Hibbard (Herman the Henchman) Dave Lynn (Queen Morgiana) & Danielle Carson (Snow White) & Pollyann Tanner (Fairy Godmother)
- 1994/95 – Dick Whittington – Starring Jimmy Cricket
- 1995/96 – Aladdin – Starring Timmy Mallett (Aladdin)
- 1996/97 – Cinderella – Starring Jess Conrad as Prince Charming and Bernie Clifton as Buttons
- 1997/98 – Babes in the Wood – (Charles Vance Productions) Starring Paul Leyshon (Robin Hood), Hugo Myatt (the Sheriff of Nottingham) and the Roly Polys as the Merry Men
- 1998/99 – Jack and the Beanstalk (Charles Vance Productions) Starring Colin Baker (Dame Durden). With Rod, Jane and Freddy
- 1999/2000 – Snow White and the Seven Dwarfs (Charles Vance Productions) Starring Jacinta Stapleton (Neighbours' Amy Greenwood) as Snow White and Paul Ladlow as the Wicked Queen. Also featured Mike McCabe and Sandy Martin (BBC Radio Swindon).

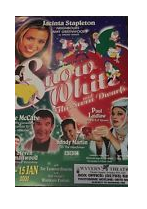
Jacinta Stapleton Wyvern panto flyer

- 2000/1 – Aladdin (Charles Vance Productions) Starring Aleetza Wood (Home and Away's Peta Janossi) as Aladdin, Geoffrey Hinsliff (Coronation Street's Don Brennan) as Widow Twanky, Bobby Dazzler as Wishee Washee and Juliette Kaplan (Last of the Summer Wine's Pearl) as the Empress of China. Also featured Tweedy & Alexis as Ping and Pong.
- 2001/2 – Cinderella starring Emma Willis (Cinderella), Bernie Clifton (Buttons), Pollyann Tanner (Dandini), Paul Mead (Baron Hardup)
- 2002/3 – Dick Whittington starring Geoffrey Hayes (Simple Simon), Pollyann Tanner (Dick), Hugo Myatt (King Rat), Colin Baker (Sarah the Cook).
- 2003/4 – Goldilocks and the Three Bears starring Vicky Binns (Goldilocks), Howard Taylor (Ringmaster), Ross Davidson (Dame Dolly), Amanda Sandow, Alfie the Alligator and Willy Wyvern
- 2004/5 – Jack and the Beanstalk starring Juliette Kaplan (Fairy), Paul Bradley (Fleshcreep), Jo Martell (Jill), Daniel Boys (Jack)
- 2005/6 – Peter Pan starring Steven Pinder (Captain Hook), Daniel Boys (Peter Pan), Jonah Cook (John Darling), Aaron Jenkins (Michael Darling).
- 2006/7 – No pantomime due to Temporary Closure
- 2007/8 – Cinderella starring Britt Ekland (Fairy Godmother) and Tequila her Chihuahua & Ross Hunter
- 2008/9 – Aladdin starring Shaun Williamson (Abanazar), Neal Andrews (Wishee Washee)
- 2009/10 – Sleeping Beauty starring Lorraine Chase (Carabosse), Ceri-Lyn Cissone (Sleeping Beauty), Edd Post (Prince Harry)
- 2010/11 – Peter Pan starring Paul Nicholas (Captain Hook), Richard Vincent (Peter Pan), Pearce Barron (John Darling), Thomas Snowball (Michael Darling)
- 2011/12 – Cinderella starring Keith Chegwin (Buttons), Saskia Strallen (Cinderella), Adam King (Prince Charming), Alex Young (Fairy Godmother)
- 2012/13 – Aladdin starring Keith Chegwin (Wishee Washee) David Ashley (Abanazar) Suzie Chard (Fairy)
- 2013/14 – Jack and the Beanstalk starring Keith Chegwin (Silly Billy), David Ashley (Dame Trot), Jennifer Greenwood (The Fairy)
- 2014/15 – Dick Whittinton starring Nigel Havers (King Rat), David Ashley (Sarah the Cook), Lucy Kane (Alice Fitzwarren)
- 2015/16 – Snow White and the Seven Dwarfs starring Adam Woodyatt (Chambers) & David Ashley (Nurse Nelly)
- 2016/17 – Cinderella starring Ryan Thomas and David Ashley
- 2017/18 – Peter Pan starring Adam Woodyatt
- 2018/19 – Aladdin starring Adam Woodyatt
- 2019/20 – Sleeping Beauty starring Michelle Collins and Adam Woodyatt
- 2020/21 – No pantomime due to COVID-19
- 2021/22 – Jack and the Beanstalk
- 2022/23 – Beauty and the Beast starring Anne Hegerty
- 2023/24 - Snow White and the Seven Dwarfs starring Samantha Dorrance (Snow White), David Ashley (Nurse Nelly) & Paul Burling
- 2024/25 - Cinderella starring Lisa George and Ben Goffe
- 2025/26 - Sleeping Beauty starring Jenny Ryan

== Behind the scenes ==
Backstage at the Wyvern Theatre 11/10/08

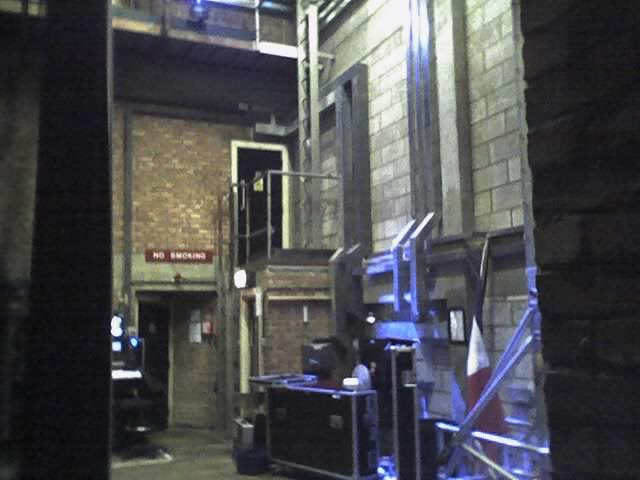
Backstage at the Wyvern Theatre 11/10/08

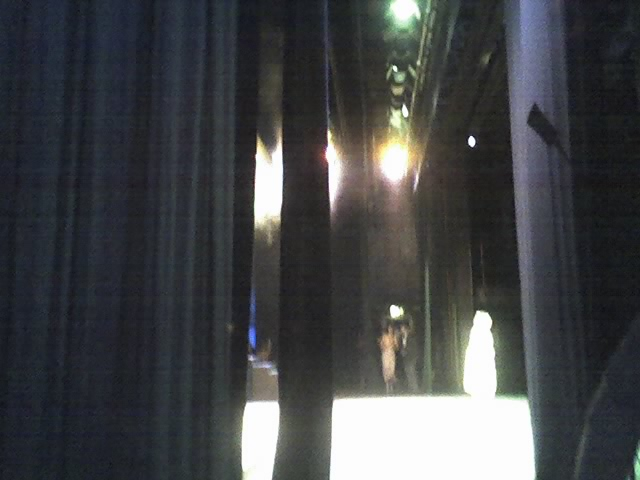
Backstage at the Wyvern Theatre 11/10/08

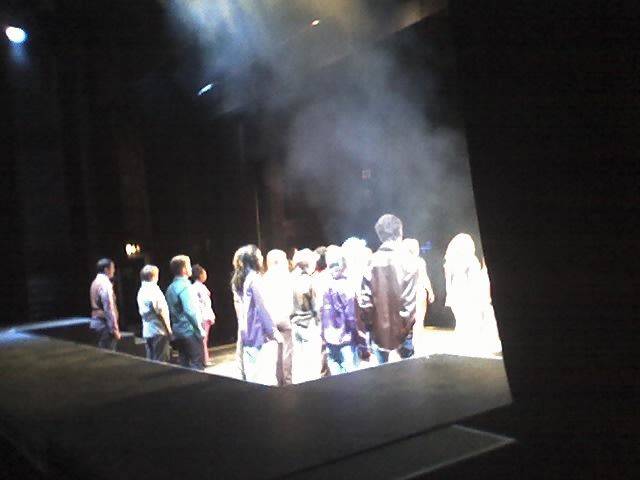
Backstage at the Wyvern Theatre 11/10/08

== Awards ==
- 2015 – Venue of the Year Award at the annual HQ Theatre awards
- 2016 – Trip Advisor Certificate of Excellence
- 2017 – Trip Advisor Certificate of Excellence
- 2017 – UK Theatre's Most Welcoming Venue in the South West
- 2017 – Muddy Stilettos Best Theatre in the South West
- 2018 – Trip Advisor Certificate of Excellence
- 2019 – Trip Advisor Certificate of Excellence

== Summer Youth Project ==
- 1994 – Bugsy Malone
- 1995 – Annie
- 1996 – 42nd Street
- 1997 – My Fair Lady
- 1998 – Oliver!
- 1999 – Me and My Girl
- 2000 – Joseph and the Amazing Technicolor Dreamcoat
- 2001 – Crazy for You
- 2002 – West Side Story
- 2003 – Fame – 10th Anniversary year of SYP
- 2004 – The Sound of Music
- 2005 – Guys and Dolls
- 2006 – Annie
- 2007 – No show due to Temporary Closure
- 2008 – Oliver!
- 2009 – Boogie Nights
- 2010 – The Wizard of Oz
- 2011 – Anything Goes
- 2012 – West Side Story
- 2013 – Our House
- 2014 – Bugsy Malone – 20th anniversary of SYP
- 2015 – Hairspray
- 2016 – Grease
- 2017 – Summer Holiday
- 2018 – Oliver!
- 2019 – Chitty Chitty Bang Bang
- 2020, 2021 – No show due to COVID-19
- 2022 – Legally Blonde
- 2023 – The Wizard of Oz
- 2024 - The Little Mermaid
- 2025 - Annie
- 2026 - Little Shop of Horrors
