= Time Busters =

- Created by: Tim Child
- Country of origin: United Kingdom
- Original language: English
- No. of series: 3
- No. of episodes: 37

Production
- Running time: 25 minutes
- Production company: Broadsword Productions

Original release
- Network: BBC2
- Release: 17 January 1993 – 22 January 1995

Time Busters is a British children's television series created by Tim Child and the same producers of Knightmare. It was first shown on BBC2 from 17 January 1993 to 22 January 1995.

== Format ==
Each run of the game involves a team of children taking a 'time-travelling' bus that drove them to a historical reenactment. The children would be involved in a quest to find a Time-Capsule. This challenge would be a race against the clock to succeed and each episode would result in the team being successful, or having to abandon their attempt due to running out of time. Regardless the episode would conclude with the children quickly returning to the bus before it disappeared from that era.

== Transmissions ==
Series	Start date	End date	Episodes
1	17 January 1993	28 March 1993	11
2	24 October 1993	23 January 1994	13
3	16 October 1994	22 January 1995	13

== See also ==
- Time travel in fiction
- List of time travel works of fiction
