= Bradford Odeon =

Cinema & former cinema in West Yorkshire, England

Coordinates: 53°47′32.9″N 1°45′23.4″W

Bradford Odeon is the name applied to two different cinemas in central Bradford, West Yorkshire, England. One, in Godwin Street, was built in 1930 and survives; the other, in Manchester Road, was built in 1938 and demolished in 1969.

== Godwin Street building ==
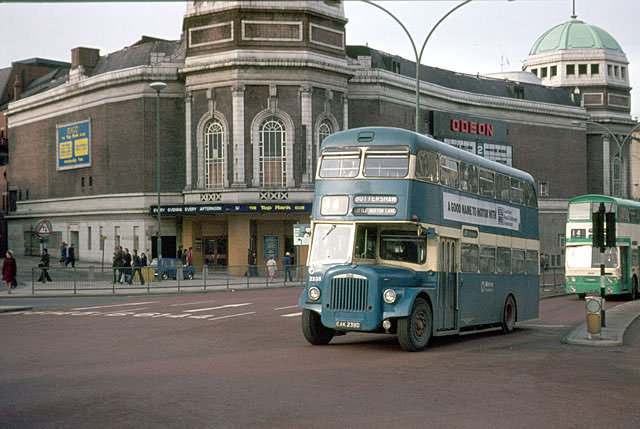
A 1977 view of the New Victoria / Gaumont as the Odeon, with two West Yorkshire PTE buses passing in front

The cinema, originally built as a 3,318 seat cine-variety theatre, was the largest outside London, and the third largest in England. It was completed in 1930 as the New Victoria. It is on the site of William Whittaker's brewery and malting, which had closed in 1928. It is a Renaissance Revival building designed by the architect William Illingworth, with copper-covered cupolas on two corners complementing those on the neighbouring Bradford Alhambra theatre. The New Victoria combined a 3,318-seat auditorium, 450 square feet (42 m^{2}) ballroom and 200-seat restaurant. The auditorium was primarily a cinema, but also a concert and ballet venue with a stage, orchestra pit, Wurlitzer organ and excellent acoustics.

As a cinema it was the third largest in Britain when it opened, with only the Trocadero at Elephant & Castle and Davis Theatre at Croydon being larger. By 1930 cinemas had converted to screen sound pictures, which had been introduced in 1927, but the New Victoria was the first cinema in Britain to be purpose-built for "talkies". It was built at a cost of £250,000 for Provincial Cinematograph Theatres, backed by the Gaumont British Picture Corporation. In 1950 the complex was renamed the Gaumont, by this time both the Odeon and Gaumont circuits were controlled by Circuits Management Association Ltd., a subsidiary of the Rank Organisation. With the city's Odeon scheduled for re-development by Bradford Corporation, Rank decided to redevelop the Gaumont as a twin cinema and bingo club and on 30 November 1968 it closed for nine months. By the time that the building was ready to re-open, the original Odeon had been closed for five months and the new complex opened on 21 August 1969 with the Odeon name.

=== The Gaumont as the Odeon ===
The Rank Organisation converted the Gaumont into a complex with the former circle divided into two film auditoria, one of 1,200 and the other of 467 seats. The former stalls were converted into a 1,000 seat Top Rank bingo hall, replacing the company's bingo operation in the former Majestic cinema in Morley Street. The "Odeon" name was transferred to the new two-screen cinema, which opened in August 1969. The bingo hall opened later in the year.

The Gaumont (formerly New Victoria) ballroom had also closed in 1968, and it remained unused for 20 years. In 1988 Rank had it converted into a 244-seat auditorium and reopened that June as a third screen of the cinema.

In 1991 Rank had plans prepared to convert the bingo hall into three film auditoria and the former restaurant into retail units. In 1994 it had plans prepared to divide the 1,200-seat auditorium into three auditoria and the 467-seat auditorium into two. Neither plan was implemented.

In the 1990s the Gallagher Group planned to redevelop a site at Thornbury on the eastern edge of Bradford into a leisure park that would include a 13-screen multiplex. The cinema chain originally contracted to operate it withdrew, so Odeon (Rank had sold the cinema chain to Cinven in February 2000) took its place and in July 2000 opened the new cinema as the Odeon Leeds-Bradford. It closed the Bradford Odeon in June 2000 and the Odeon Cinema Leeds in 2001.

=== Live music ===
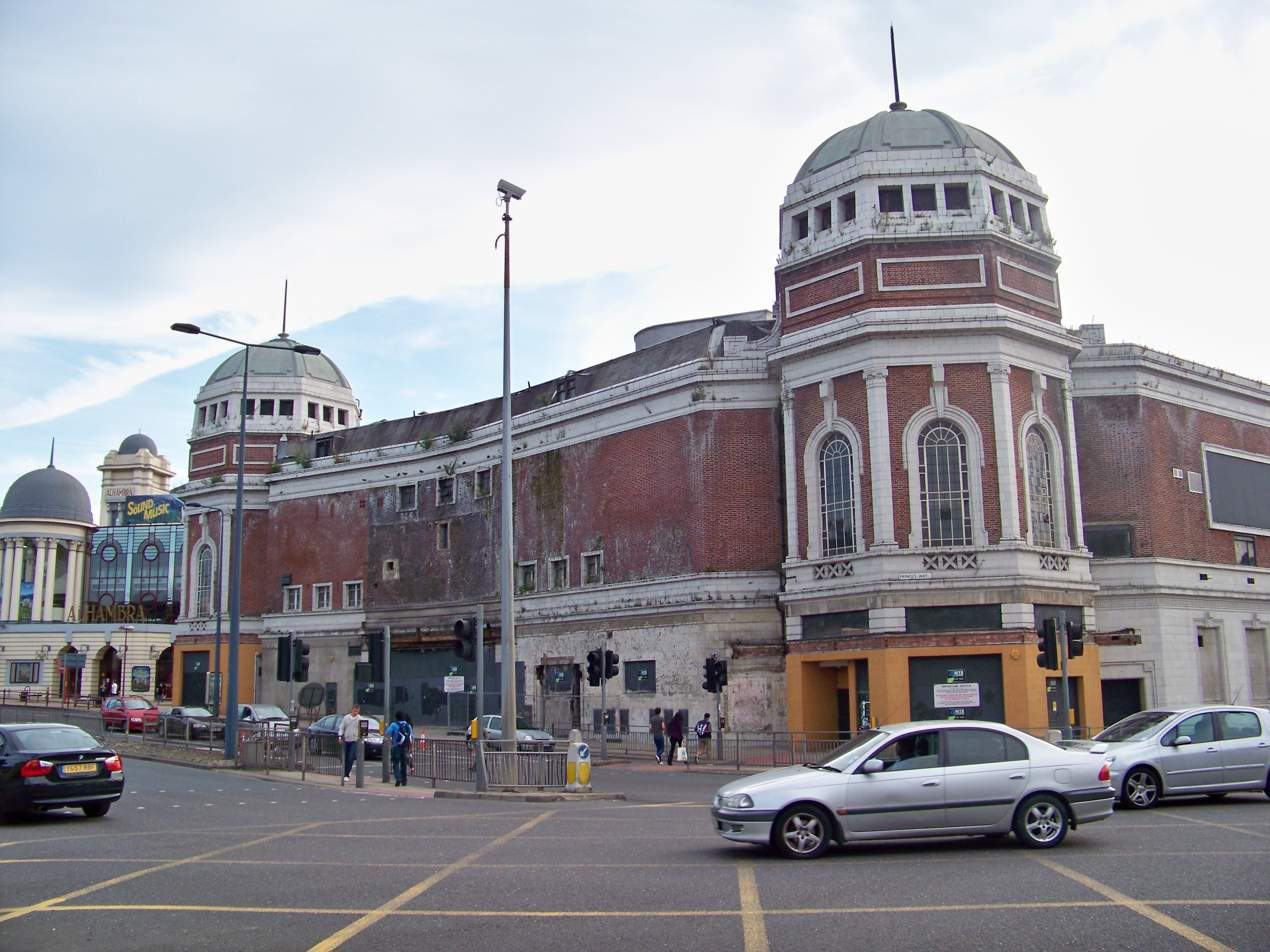
The New Victoria / Gaumont building disused in 2009

The New Victoria / Gaumont was a distinguished venue for live music. Big bands played for dancers in its ballroom, and its season included charity balls hosted by the Grand Order of Water Rats and the National Union of Journalists. The main auditorium was the largest concert venue in the north of England. The London Symphony Orchestra (LSO) played at its opening gala in 1930, and a subsequent LSO concert was conducted by Leopold Stokowski. Further classical music performances included the London Festival Ballet in 1952 and the Italian tenor Beniamino Gigli in 1954.

The Gaumont's main auditorium continued to host stage performances. In 1950 it hosted an ice show, Babes in the Wood on Ice.

UK tours of the most successful popular music acts included concerts at the Gaumont, including Billy Daniels (1953), Frankie Laine (1953), Bill Haley & His Comets (1957), Buddy Holly (1958), Paul Anka, Count Basie and the Peruvian soprano Yma Sumac. In 1960 the Gaumont hosted Gene Vincent and Eddie Cochran's first ever British concert, and Vince Eager was the supporting act.

1963 was a notable year at the Gaumont. In February Helen Shapiro headlined a concert there, with supporting performances by Danny Williams and Kenny Lynch. At the bottom of the bill was a new band called The Beatles, who were about to release their first LP record Please Please Me. In October The Everly Brothers headlined a concert with supporting acts by Bo Diddley and another new British band, The Rolling Stones. In December The Beatles returned, headlining a concert playing to two packed houses with supporting performances from The Barron Knights, Tommy Quickly, Billy J. Kramer, Cilla Black and Rolf Harris.

The Rolling Stones returned in 1965, this time heading the bill. Tom Jones sang at the Gaumont in 1968.

=== Redevelopment proposals ===
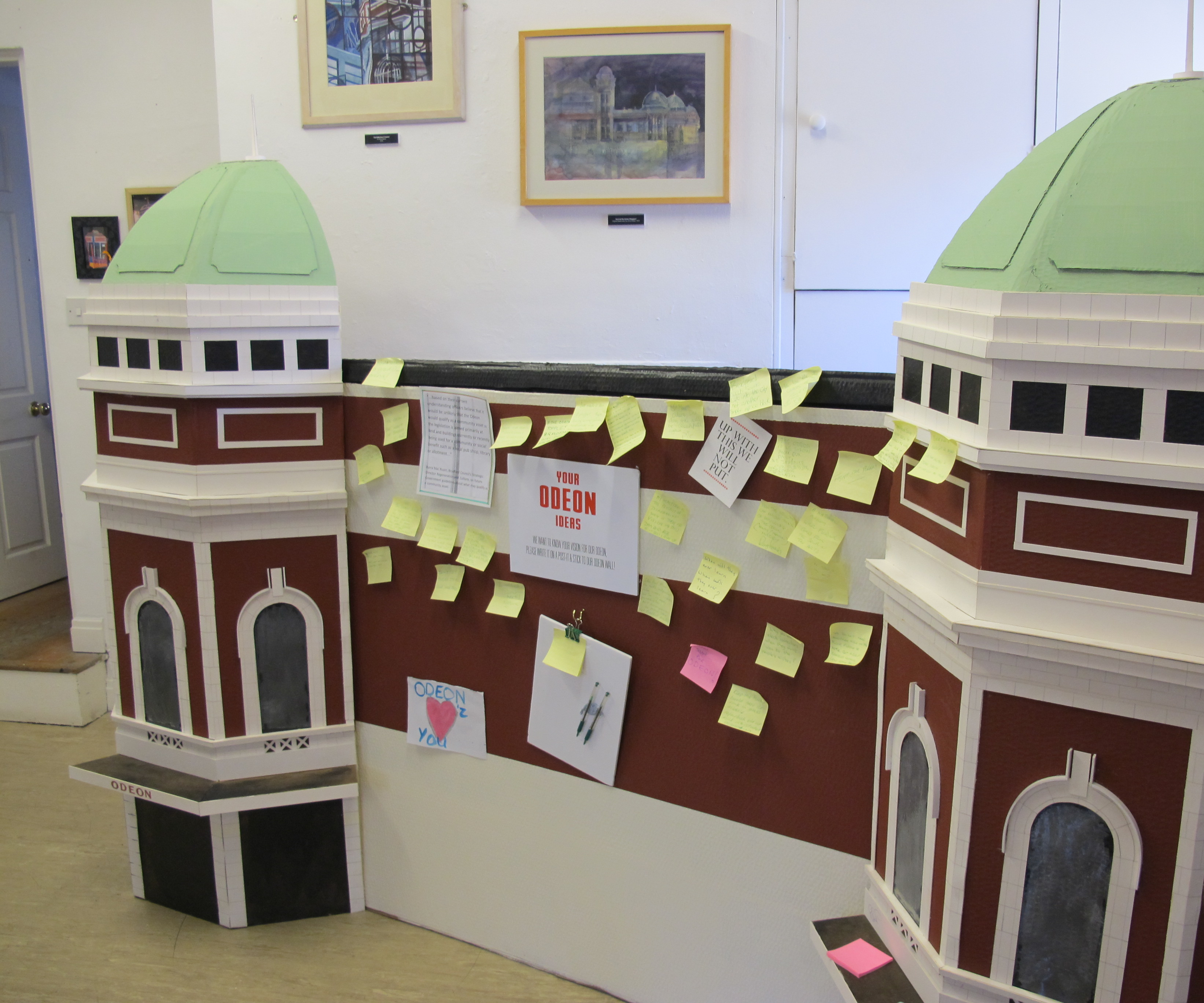
Model of part of the New Victoria / Gaumont building at an exhibition in 2012

Since 2000, asbestos has been removed from the former New Victoria / Gaumont building but it has remained unused. In 2003 the regional development agency Yorkshire Forward bought it for £3 million and proposed to redevelop the site. Public opposition quickly formed the Bradford Odeon Rescue Group (BORG), whose campaign included a "Hug the Odeon" event in July 2007 in which an estimated 1,000 people encircled the building in a human chain. BORG's supporters include Richard Attenborough, George Clarke and Jonathan Foyle.

In 2009 an open public campaign began which included several websites, Twitter accounts and Facebook groups created by members of the public. As part of the public 'Save The Odeon' campaign, a series of demonstrations around the building were organised by members of the public, such as an alternative Christmas lights switch-on, projections onto the towers of the building during the opening of City Park, and pinning 'get well soon' cards and flowers to the building during maintenance works. The public campaign gathered the support of David Hockney, Terry Jones, Terry Gilliam, Jenny Agutter, Michael Winner and Imelda Staunton.

Yorkshire Forward contracted a commercial property development company, Langtree Group, to demolish the building and redevelop the site. However, in March 2012 Yorkshire Forward was abolished as a result of HM Treasury's 2010 Spending Review, and in September 2012 ownership of the building passed to the Homes and Communities Agency (HCA).

In late 2013 the HCA sold the building to Bradford City Council for a nominal £1 on condition that the latter invest £1.32 million in its maintenance and repair. The city council invited bids to redevelop the building, retaining as much as possible of its original fabric.

Two parties, Bradford Live and Bradford One, each proposed to remove the partitions and false walls inserted in 1968–69 and restore the original auditorium as a single performance space. Bradford One said the restored auditorium would provide part-standing capacity for 3107 people, or for 2,487 people all seated. Bradford Live said redevelopment would cost £20 million and claimed it could increase capacity from the original 3,318 seats to between 3,500 and 4,000.

In January 2019 Bradford Live and NEC Group International working together secured £4 million funding and aimed to start construction in summer 2019. The redevelopment of the Bradford Odeon into Bradford Live suffered numerous setbacks and delays due to the COVID-19 pandemic and parts of the existing building needing to be fully replaced rather than simply refurbished, pushing the completion of the new venue to 2024. In September 2024, when most of the refurbishment had been completed, NEC Group pulled out of the project "with immediate effect". Susan Hinchcliffe, leader of Bradford Council, stated that they would now be in discussion with several potential operators, and still intended to have the venue open to host events during Bradford City of Culture 2025.

In February 2025, Trafalgar Entertainment agreed to take on the operation of the building, and signed a 25-year lease with Bradford Council. They announced that the official opening would be in late August or early September, By May, the announced programme included events from 1 August.

=== In popular culture ===
The Godwin Street building, under the name New Victoria, was the subject of an episode entitled "The Palace of Dreams" in the UK TV series Portillo's Hidden History of Britain, broadcast 30 November 2018 on Channel 5.

== Manchester Road building ==
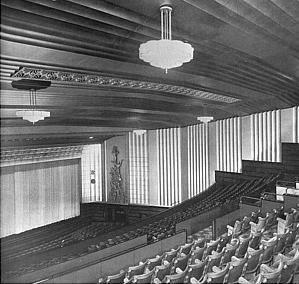
Auditorium of the Odeon in Manchester Road in 1938

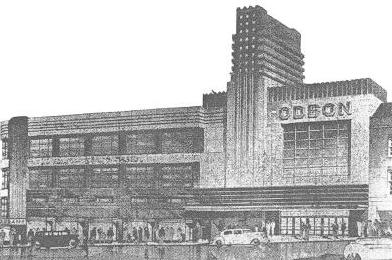
1937 artist's impression of the Odeon in Manchester Road that was built in 1938 and demolished in 1969

The building in Manchester Road was completed in 1938, on the site of Joseph Cooper's Central Mills Wool Combing works. It was a 2,713-seat super cinema built for Oscar Deutsch's Odeon Cinemas as a competitor to what was then the New Victoria. Odeon's house style was futuristic Art Deco, and this one was a Streamline Moderne building designed by the architect Robert Bullivant of Harry Weedon and Partners.

A Luftwaffe air raid in August 1940 seriously damaged the building, but despite wartime restrictions Deutsch had extensive repairs completed in only 10 weeks, reopening the cinema on Armistice Day 1940. Capacity was slightly reduced to 2,685 seats.

Although Rank would normally have been expected to keep the Odeon open until the re-developed Gaumont had opened (as happened in other cities), Bradford City Council required the site and it closed on 22 March 1969 and was demolished to make way for a realignment of Manchester Road.
