= Shababnews =

- studioshababnews.JPG
- Genre: Youth news
- Presented by: Mohamed al Rimawi, Malak al Khouri
- Original language: Arabic

Production
- Production location: Amman - Jordan

Original release
- Network: JRTV

Shababnews ("Youth News") is a television programme in Jordan founded in 2001 by Firas Mawlawi.

The first TV News Programme for young people in Arabic was launched on Jordan Television on April 5, 2007. Shababnews runs for half an hour every week on Thursdays at 5pm and is targeted at teenagers up to 15 years old. In a region where news is often an official 'product', it is an interesting development, following over two dozen similar programmes in Europe, some of which have been on air for over thirty years.

The Shababnews programmes are available to Arabic speakers all over the world, via the web-site.

The first edition of Shababnews included a report on one of the biggest local health problems confronting young people -- diabetes. A cartoon analysis of the causes of the illness was inter-cut with material from Jordan, including an interview with a young person with diabetes. The programme also reported on two 15-year-old local entrepreneurs and students from The Music and Ballet School of Baghdad reflecting on the war and violence in Iraq. Later programmes have had reports on child labour and plastic bags.

Shababnews states that it aims to highlight the issues that concern young people and give space for their voices, calling for changes and improvements. It was established with funding from the Dutch government and technical assistance from Jemstone Media, a NGO active in the region for more than 12 years.

The programme has been accepted as an associate member of the European Broadcasting Union (EBU) network of youth news TV programmes, which means that Jordan can be a window on the Arab world for young people in Europe.

The Shababnews presenters are: Mohamed al Rimawi and Malak al Khouri. The rest of the team includes: Reema Awadallah, Lana Afanah, Nahed Katatba, Alia Hattouk and Rand Jammal. The studio director is Majed abu Rabieh.
