= Trafalgar Entertainment =

British multinational entertainment group

Trafalgar Entertainment is a British multinational entertainment group co-founded in 2017 by Sir Howard Panter and Dame Rosemary Squire after they stepped down from running Ambassador Theatre Group. Based in London, UK, the company primarily focuses on new productions and the distribution of live streamed content.

Trafalgar Entertainment is the second-largest theatre operator in the UK.

== History ==
In 2004, Ambassador Theatre Group first announced that the Whitehall Theatre in London would be reconfigured and reopened with the new name Trafalgar Studios.

After being founded in 2017, Trafalgar acquired the global event cinema business Picturehouse Entertainment, rebranding to Trafalgar Releasing, which specialises in broadcasting live productions.

The following year, the company acquired Stagecoach Performing Arts, a UK provider of Performing Arts tuition with over 2,000 schools and classes. Stagecoach shares a Head Office with Trafalgar Entertainment in Woking, UK.

In 2019, Trafalgar Entertainment began a new partnership with London Theatre Direct, one of the UK's leading ticket retailer distributors and acquired UK-based event cinema distribution specialist, More2Screen.

Later that year, the company announced the launch of Jonathan Church Theatre Productions with theatre director and producer Jonathan Church as artistic director.

=== 2020-2022 ===
In March 2020, Trafalgar Entertainment's flagship London venue Trafalgar Studios was forced to close its doors as a result of the COVID-19 pandemic. In May of that year, Westminster City Council granted planning permission to return Trafalgar Studios to a 630-seat theatre. Building work commenced in the Summer of 2020 and the redevelopment was overseen by Foster Wilson Size Architects.

In May 2020, Trafalgar Entertainment reached an agreement with the New South Wales Government in Australia to become the new operator of Theatre Royal Sydney in a 55-year sublease. In July 2021, Theatre Royal Sydney reopened with Alanis Morissette's Broadway Musical Jagged Little Pill.

In March 2021, the company acquired HQ Theatres, the UK's largest specialist regional theatre operator with a portfolio of 12 theatres, including Cliffs Pavilion in Westcliff-on-Sea, G Live in Guildford, Churchill Theatre in Bromley and the Orchard Theatre in Dartford.

Trafalgar Entertainment also went on to acquire a 35-year lease at the British Airways Theatre, London, in May 2021. The theatre is currently under development as part of the regeneration of Olympia London and is set to open in 2025.

In June 2021, Trafalgar Entertainment opened its first cinema complex, The Chiswick Cinema, a five-screen cinema with a private members club. It was the first new cinema in Chiswick, England, to open since 1934.

After a restoration project in 2020, Trafalgar Studios was reopened as Trafalgar Theatre in July 2021 with a revival of the musical Jersey Boys. The restoration returned the venue to a single auditorium with a capacity of 630 seats.

In August 2021, HQ Theatres, as part of the Trafalgar Entertainment group, became the new operator of The New Theatre in Cardiff, Wales, with a 25-year lease.

The following month, Trafalgar Entertainment successfully acquired the children's performing arts organisation Helen O'Grady Drama Academy.

In 2022, the company acquired the London theatre app Stagedoor.

==== 2023 – present ====
In April 2023, Trafalgar Entertainment announced the acquisition of its first Scottish venue, The Pavilion Theatre, in Glasgow, Scotland. It is one of the oldest theatres in Scotland, first opening in 1904.

In August 2023, Trafalgar Entertainment acquired Imagine Theatre, one of the UK's largest pantomime producers. In May 2025, Imagine Theatre opened its new "production base, central store, and creative hub" in Coventry. Named Trafalgar House, the 68,000-square-foot facility serves as the company's headquarters.

In March 2024, Trafalgar Entertainment was named in the FT1000 annual ranking of Europe's fastest growing companies.

In May 2025, King Charles III and Queen Camilla visited Bradford Live in Bradford as part of the city's year as UK City of Culture 2025. The former Odeon Cinema had closed in 2000 and was subsequently restored and reopened as a live entertainment venue following a £50 million investment. The venue's first public performances were held in August 2025.

In October 2025, Trafalgar Entertainment and The Shubert Organization announced a 50:50 joint venture for the ownership and operation of the new 1,575-seat British Airways Theatre in London, initially developed as the Olympia Theatre. British Airways acquired the naming rights for the theatre, which is currently under construction and scheduled to open in 2027.

In June 2026, Trafalgar Entertainment announced its acquisition of the London Theatre Company (LTC), founded by Nicholas Hytner and Nick Starr. The deal included the Bridge Theatre and a King's Cross venue housing Lightroom, an immersive visual arts venue.

== Divisions ==
In 2022, Trafalgar Entertainment announced the launch of two new divisions; Trafalgar Theatres and Trafalgar Tickets.

=== Trafalgar Theatres ===
Trafalgar Theatres was launched in May 2022 as part of the company consolidating its venue operations under one division. The previously acquired HQ Theatres brand was retired, and the 12 UK regional venues became a part of the new Trafalgar Theatres division. The company's flagship venue Trafalgar Theatre, as well as British Airways Theatre, and Sydney's Theatre Royal were also made part of the division.

=== Trafalgar Tickets ===
As part of Trafalgar Entertainment's consolidation in 2022, Trafalgar Tickets was also launched for regional ticketing. Johan Oostervald leads this new division as the CEO of Trafalgar Tickets.

=== Trafalgar Theatre Productions ===
Trafalgar Entertainment's Theatre Productions division deals primarily with producing new shows and musicals in London, UK and internationally. Co-founder Sir Howard Panter is the creative director of this division.

== Venues managed by Trafalgar Entertainment ==
Venue	Location	Start year	Trafalgar Entertainment role	Seated capacity
Trafalgar Theatre	London, UK	2016	Trafalgar Entertainment manages and owns the theatre.	630
British Airways Theatre	London, UK	2021	Trafalgar Entertainment holds a 35-year lease, and the venue is set to open in 2027.	1575
Fareham Live	Hampshire, UK	2023	Trafalgar Entertainment will operate the theatre on behalf of Fareham Borough Council.	1000
Theatre Royal, Sydney	Sydney, Australia	2020	Trafalgar Entertainment hold a 55-year sublease.	1200
The Chiswick Cinema	Chiswick, UK	2021	Trafalgar Entertainment owns and operates the cinema.	401
Churchill Theatre	Bromley, UK	2021	Trafalgar Entertainment operates the theatre.	785
New Theatre	Cardiff, Wales	2021	Trafalgar Entertainment manages and owns the theatre.	1144
Lyceum Theatre	Crewe, UK	2021	Trafalgar Entertainment operates the theatre on behalf of Cheshire East Council.	677
Orchard Theatre	Dartford, UK	2021	Trafalgar Entertainment operates the theatre on behalf of Dartford Borough Council.	956
The Pavilion	Glasgow, Scotland	2023	Trafalgar Entertainment manages and owns the theatre.	1449
G Live	Guildford, UK	2021	Trafalgar Entertainment operates the theatre on behalf of Guildford Borough Council.	1000
Wycombe Swan	High Wycombe, UK	2021	Trafalgar Entertainment operates the theatre on behalf of the Wycombe District Council.	1076
Cliffs Pavilion	Southend-on-Sea, UK	2021	Trafalgar Entertainment operates the theatre on behalf of Southend-on-Sea Borough Council.	1630
The Palace Theatre	Southend-on-Sea, UK	2021	Trafalgar Entertainment operates the theatre on behalf of Southend-on-Sea Borough Council.	603
Swindon Arts Centre	Swindon, UK	2021	Trafalgar Entertainment operates the theatre on behalf of Swindon Borough Council.	200
Wyvern Theatre	Swindon, UK	2021	Trafalgar Entertainment operates the theatre on behalf of Swindon Borough Council.	635
Congress Theatre	Eastbourne, UK	2024	Trafalgar Entertainment operates the theatre in partnership with Eastbourne Borough Council.	1,689
Devonshire Park Theatre	Eastbourne, UK	2024	Trafalgar Entertainment operates the theatre in partnership with Eastbourne Borough Council.	873
Winter Garden	Eastbourne, UK	2024	Trafalgar Entertainment operates the theatre in partnership with Eastbourne Borough Council.	1000
Bradford Live	Bradford, UK	2025	Trafalgar Entertainment operates the music venue.	3800
Bridge Theatre	London, UK	2026	Trafalgar Entertainment owns and operates the theatre.	900

== Media Coverage ==
During the COVID-19 lockdown imposed by the British Government, Trafalgar Entertainment co-founders Sir Howard Panter and Dame Rosemary Squire began a media campaign to help reopen theatres across the UK.

In May 2021, Panter published an article in The Times criticising the British Government for lack of clarity on when theatres and entertainment venues would be able to reopen without restrictions.

== Shareholders ==
The largest shareholder of Trafalgar Entertainment is Barings Alternative Investment, which operates as a subsidiary of MassMutual Holding LLC. Other shareholders include Greg Dyke, James Tanner, NWH Consulting Ltd, Sir Richard Branson and Griffon Corporation.
