= Keeping Mum =

2005 British comedy film by Niall Johnson

- Theatrical release poster
- Directed by: Niall Johnson
- Written by: Niall Johnson; Richard Russo
- Produced by: Julia Palau; Matthew Payne
- Starring: Rowan Atkinson; Maggie Smith; Kristin Scott Thomas; Tamsin Egerton; Patrick Swayze
- Cinematography: Gavin Finney
- Edited by: Robin Sales
- Music by: Dickon Hinchliffe
- Production companies: Summit Entertainment; Isle of Man Film; Azure Films; Tusk Productions
- Distributed by: Entertainment Film Distributors; THINKFilm (United States)
- Release dates: 2 December 2005 (United Kingdom); 6 October 2006 (United States)
- Running time: 99 minutes
- Country: United Kingdom
- Language: English
- Box office: $18.5 million

Keeping Mum is a 2005 British crime comedy film co written and directed by Niall Johnson and starring Rowan Atkinson, Kristin Scott Thomas, Maggie Smith and Patrick Swayze. It was produced by Summit Entertainment, Isle of Man Film, Azure Films and Tusk Productions, and was released in the United Kingdom on 2 December 2005, by Entertainment Film Distributors.

== Plot ==
When a young pregnant woman named Rosie Jones boards a train, her enormous trunk starts leaking blood in the luggage compartment. Questioned by the police about the dead bodies inside, Rosie calmly reveals they are her unfaithful husband and his mistress. Convicted of manslaughter, she is imprisoned in a unit for the criminally insane due to diminished responsibility.

Forty-three years later, Walter Goodfellow, the village vicar of Little Wallop, is very busy writing the perfect sermon for a Church of England convention. He's completely oblivious to his family's problems: his wife, Gloria, has unfulfilled emotional/sexual needs and starts an affair with her golf instructor Lance, the vicar's daughter Holly has a growing sex drive and is constantly changing boyfriends, and his son Petey is being bullied at school.

New housekeeper Grace Hawkins becomes involved in their lives, learning about their problems: neighbor Mr. Brown's Jack Russell Terrier Clarence barks non-stop, preventing Gloria from sleeping; Petey's bullies; and Gloria's burgeoning illicit affair.

Grace sets out to solve the problems in her own way by killing Clarence as well as Mr. Brown, sabotaging the brakes on the bullies' bicycles which violently incapacitates them all and killing Lance with a clothes iron outside the house.

As Walter prepares the sermon for the conference, Grace suggests adding humor. Also, seeing he has let his relationship slide due to his devotion to God, she shows him he can love his wife and God by looking at the erotic references in the Song of Solomon. As the problems in the household seem to gradually clear, Walter leaves for his convention.

Gloria and Holly see Grace's photo on the news, showing her release and previous offences, and they begin to realize what she's done. It is revealed that "Grace" is Gloria's long-lost mother Rosie Jones, who's come to meet her. After briefly processing the flood of information, Gloria asserts that when having a problem with someone, one cannot just kill them. Grace mentions this is the point she and her doctors could never agree on. Despite their disagreements, Gloria tries to help Grace with Lance's body, but cannot handle it. Over a cup of tea, the three women decide not to tell Walter or Petey any of what has happened.

Nagging congregant Mrs. Parker visits to discuss the problem of the "church's flower arranging committee". Grace, erroneously believing Mrs. Parker is about to turn them in for her crimes, attempts to hit her with a frying pan but Gloria stops her. Mrs. Parker, shocked, has a heart attack and dies. Walter returns from the convention just then and sees Mrs. Parker's body, but not realizing she is dead. Soon after, Grace leaves the family when order is seemingly restored among them.

Walter talks to Bob and Ted, the two waterworks employees who have been working quietly in the background on the vicarage's pond during recent events. They advise the pond has blue green algae in it which means there is the possibility of the pond poisoning people as the pond is connected to the local area's water table, meaning the pond needs to be drained. Remembering Grace's victims' bodies are in the pond, Gloria, with a strained smile, offers them some tea.

The film ends with an underwater shot depicting the bodies that had been placed in the pond, including the recently added Bob and Ted.

== Cast ==
- Rowan Atkinson as Reverend Walter Goodfellow
- Kristin Scott Thomas as Gloria Goodfellow
- Maggie Smith as Rosie Jones/Grace Hawkins
- Emilia Fox as Young Rosie Jones
- Patrick Swayze as Lance
- Tamsin Egerton as Holly Goodfellow
- Toby Parkes as Petey Goodfellow
- Liz Smith as Mrs. Parker
- James Booth as Mr. Brown
- Patrick Monckton as Bob
- Rowley Irlam as Ted
- Vivienne Moore as Mrs. Martin
- Murray McArthur as the Vicar's Convention Master of Ceremonies
- Roger Hammond as The Judge
- Alex Macqueen as train ticket collector

== Production ==
Principal photography began in February 2005. The main filming location was in the village of St Michael Penkevil in Cornwall. Locations on the Isle of Man were used for all filming outside the village. The outer shots of the train is on the North Yorkshire Moors Railway, the scene with the car going over a small bridge with the train going over another is just outside Goathland (Aidensfield in Heartbeat).

== Reception ==
Review aggregator website Rotten Tomatoes reported that 56% of critics gave the film positive write-ups based on 87 reviews, with an average rating of 5.9/10. The site's critical consensus reads, "The stellar cast, including Kristin Scott Thomas and Dame Maggie Smith, is certainly an asset, but this black comedy is too uneven." On Metacritic, the film received an average score of 53 out of 100 based on 22 critics, indicating "mixed or average reviews".

When the film was originally released in the United Kingdom, it opened at #4, behind Harry Potter and the Goblet of Fire, Flightplan and The Exorcism of Emily Rose. It retained the same spot the following weekend.
