= Niall Johnson =

English screenwriter and film director

- Born: 1964 (age 61–62); Sutton Coldfield, West Midlands, England
- Occupations: Screenwriter, Film Director

Niall Johnson (born 1964) is an English screenwriter and film director. He is best known for his 2005 comedy film Keeping Mum.

== Filmography ==
=== Film ===
Year	Film	Role
1998	The Big Swap	Writer/Director
2000	The Ghost of Greville Lodge	Writer/Director
2005	White Noise	Writer
2005	Keeping Mum	Writer/Director
2016	Mum's List	Director
2017	The Stolen	Director
2019	Acres and Acres	Director
