= Snuff-Movie =

2005 Gothic horror film

- Film poster
- Directed by: Bernard Rose
- Written by: Bernard Rose
- Produced by: Lisa Enos; Donald Kushner; Pierre Spengler; Brad Wyman
- Starring: Jeroen Krabbé; Hugo Myatt; Lisa Enos; Teri Harrison; Alastair Mackenzie; Lyndsey Marshal
- Cinematography: Bernard Rose
- Edited by: David Gamble
- Music by: Matthew Schultz
- Production company: Capitol Films
- Distributed by: Lionsgate
- Release date: 23 August 2005
- Running time: 92 minutes
- Country: United Kingdom

Snuff-Movie is a 2005 Gothic horror film written and directed by British director Bernard Rose.

== Plot ==
It stars Jeroen Krabbé as horror filmmaker Boris Arkadin, whose pregnant wife Mary was supposedly brutally murdered by a Manson-like gang of hippy psychopaths during the 1960s. An eccentric recluse, Boris makes a comeback when he invites some actors to a large mansion in the English countryside to 'audition' for his new film. Unknown to most of them they are being filmed by hidden cameras linked to a snuff website.

== Cast ==
- Jeroen Krabbé as Boris Arkadin / Mr. Maezel
- Lisa Enos as Mary Arkardin / Wendy Jones
- Teri Harrison as Pamela / Angie
- Alastair Mackenzie as Justin / Andy / Freddy / Peter
- Lyndsey Marshal as Sandy / X / Janice
- Hugo Myatt as Dr. Culpepper / Leon Bank / Desk Sergeant
- Tedy Necula as Marco Arkadin
- Joe Reegan as James / Jack

== Production ==
Though set in London, the movie was filmed in Romania, on a budget of £6 million.

== Reception ==
Philip French in The Observer wrote, "the movie is no fun, makes little sense and takes itself rather seriously". Empire called it a "lurid, DV-shot sleazefest... Disturbing and distasteful, and not in a good way". Derek Elley wrote in Variety, "Dialogue is cheesy in an unfunny way, plotting is unbelievable, even on a genre level, and performances are worthy of summer stock." The Guardian called it "preposterous". Time Out's reviewer wrote, "If there’s some fun to be had it’s in its frenzied plagiarism. It certainly fails as a thriller".

ScreenDaily was more positive: "a deliciously Machiavellian horror movie which has cult hit written all over it".
