= The Big Swap =

- DVD cover
- Directed by: Niall Johnson
- Written by: Nial Johnson
- Produced by: Nial Johnson
- Starring: Mark Adams; Sorcha Brooks; Mark Caven; Alison Egan; Richard Cherry; Julie-Ann Gillitt; Anthony Edridge; Clark Hayes; Thierry Harcourt; Jackie Sawiris; Kevin Howarth
- Cinematography: Gordon Hickie
- Edited by: Dave Thrasher
- Music by: Jason Flinter; Craig Johnson
- Production companies: Moonlit Pictures; Magic Box
- Distributed by: FilmFour
- Release date: 12 June 1998
- Running time: 122 minutes
- Country: United Kingdom
- Language: English
- Box office: £31,145 (UK)

The Big Swap is a 1998 British drama film written and directed by Niall Johnson. It discusses the exchanging sexual partners for one night between bunch of friends and how it affects their lives.

== Plot ==
A group of friends meet and plan to swap partners for one night. Every man brings his car key and they all throw it in a bunch of bowl and mix it up. Then a women picks up, blindfolded, one of the car keys and has to spend a night with whoever's owner of that car key. It starts out well, but after the party they all begin to regret their choices and the direction of their lives.

== Cast ==
- Mark Adams as Sam
- Sorcha Brooks as Ellen
- Mark Caven as Michael
- Alison Egan as Eve
- Richard Cherry as Hal
- Julie-Ann Gillitt as Liz
- Anthony Edridge as Jack
- Clark Hayes as Fi
- Thierry Harcourt as Tony
- Jackie Sawiris as Sydney
- Kevin Howarth as Julian

== Release ==
The Big Swap was released 12 June 1998.

== Reception ==
Brendan Kelly of Variety wrote, "Partner-swapping may be a catchy concept to start with, but The Big Swap simply isn't sexy enough, nor does it have enough post-coital emotional resonance to maintain interest over its two-hour running time." Jessica Mellor of Empire rated it 2/5 stars and wrote, "Even with lots of shagging and some hilariously cringe-making moments, the climax ironically comes much too soon and leaves the viewer feeling frustrated rather than satisfied." Total Film rated it 2/5 stars and wrote, "[T]his low-budget Brit flick fails to ignite, held back by rudimentary production values and bland characters."
