= El rescate del talismán =

- Genre: Game show
- Based on: Knightmare
- Country of origin: Spain
- Original language: Spanish
- No. of episodes: 78

Production
- Production company: Televisión Española

Original release
- Network: La 1
- Release: 1991 – 1994

Related
- Le Chevalier Du Labyrinthe

El rescate del talismán (English: The rescue of the talisman) is a Spanish game show for children broadcast on La 1 of Televisión Española from 1991 to 1994 for 78 episodes. Notably sponsored by Sega, it was adapted from the British TV show Knightmare.

== The plot ==
El Señor de la Maldad (English: The Lord of Evil) steals a magic talisman. A team of four young people, with the help of a magician, try to regain it.

== Gameplay ==
One contestant would wear a helmet, which would block their vision. This contestant would then enter a computer-generated castle (which was accomplished by chromakey technology). Every room of the castle contained a physical or mental challenge and the blinded contestant, guided by their team mates and the magician, would attempt to defeat it. Failure to do so caused a virtual "death" and the contestant would be replaced by another member of the team. The game was lost if all four members of the team "died". The final room contained El Señor de la Maldad and the contestant would have to face him head on, without wearing the helmet. For successfully defeating him, the contestant would retrieve the talisman and win the game.

== The Prizes ==
During the first season, teams would win various Sega video game consoles. In later seasons they won computers.

== Cast ==
- Eduardo MacGregor as The Magician (1991–1992)
- Ricardo Palacios as The Magician (1993–1994)
- Ismael Abellán as The Magician (1994)
- Daniel Fortega as El Señor de la Maldad (1991-1993)
- José Carlos Rivasas El Señor de la Maldad (1994)
- Maria Sanz
- Marga González
- Miguel A. Suárez
- Tito García
- Alberto Papa Fragumen

== See also ==
- Knightmare
- Le Chevalier Du Labyrinthe
