= Knightmare (TV series) =

British children's adventure TV game show (1987–1994)

- Created by: Tim Child
- Presented by: Hugo Myatt
- Country of origin: United Kingdom
- Original language: English
- No. of series: 8
- No. of episodes: 112

Production
- Running time: 25 minutes
- Production company: Anglia Television

Original release
- Network: ITV
- Release: 7 September 1987 – 11 November 1994

Knightmare is a British children's adventure game show, created by Tim Child and broadcast over eight series on CITV from 7 September 1987 to 11 November 1994. The general format of the show consists of a team of four children – one who takes on the game, and three acting as their guide and advisers – attempting to complete a quest within a fantasy medieval environment, traversing a large dungeon and using their wits to overcome puzzles, obstacles and the unusual characters they meet along the journey.

The show is most notable for its use of blue screen chroma key, an idea Child utilised upon seeing it being put to use in weather forecasts at the time the programme began, as well as its use of virtual reality interactive gameplay on television and the high level of difficulty faced by every team. Broadcast to high viewing figures throughout its original run, it garnered a cult status amongst fans since its final television episode in 1994. It was revived for a one-off special by YouTube in August 2013.

== Format ==
One of the dungeon's rooms

Each run of the game involves a team of four children, aged around 11–16, and focuses on the same format. One member takes on the game in person, referred to as the "Dungeoneer", but are blinded to their surroundings by the "Helmet of Justice" – a headpiece that blocks their field of vision to just around their feet. The other three act as their advisers, guiding them around, giving them advice to solving puzzles, and making notes on the information they receive. Once the Dungeoneer is ready, they are sent off on their quest. In most series, this requires the team to choose which quest they will undertake, whereupon the action takes place within a blue screen chroma key studio used to display a partly computer-generated, partly hand-drawn fantasy dungeon – only the viewers and the advisers can see this. In some cases, filming of a run takes place in real locations, where the viewpoint of these scenes is done to appear to be from that of the Dungeoneer's. The rest of the team remains in the main studio fashioned as an antechamber of "Knightmare Castle", and give instructions and details of a location to the Dungeoneer, much in the same style of text-based computer games which rely on descriptions and commands rather than visuals. An example could be that a room has a key for a locked door within, so the advisers would describe the room to the Dungeoneer and then instruct them to move towards the key, pick it up, and use it on the door to exit the room.

The objective of the game is for the team to complete three levels of a specially made dungeon designed for them. Each team faces a new dungeon of a different design, but with similar features recurring during a series. Each level consists of a number of rooms, with some having puzzles, obstacles and challenges that must be overcome. The rooms may also have various inhabitants – some will help, while others will either hinder the Dungeoneer unless they give them something they require, or attempt to stop them and end their game. In some cases, the team faces more than one exit and must choose which way to go. Every dungeon has a selection of objects, some of which will help to solve puzzles or get past certain inhabitants, while others are decoys. There are also magic spells – a single word that can be used to solve puzzles and overcome hazards and dangerous inhabitants. Spells require an adviser to spell out the word correctly (e.g. if the spell is Light, then the adviser needs to say L-I-G-H-T).

Each team is required to complete their game within a time-limit, which is represented by an on-screen animated lifeforce meter for the Dungeoneer that gradually depletes. The meter is only ever seen by the viewers, but the advisers receive clear hints about its status when they need to proceed. Since the amount of time is limited, the team must help the Dungeoneer reach checkpoints within the dungeon and instruct them to pick up a food item and put it in a knapsack given to them before they begin their run, which fully restores lifeforce. If the team make mistakes that allows the Dungeoneer to be attacked from minor monsters or hazards, they incur a time penalty which reduces the amount of time they have to complete the game, described as taking "damage" to their lifeforce. If the Dungeoneer runs out of lifeforce, the game ends. The game is also over if the team makes a bad decision and takes a wrong route into a dead end, or if the Dungeoneer is "killed" by an enemy character, monster or trap or "falls" into a pit. The appearance of the lifeforce meter varied during the course of the show's history:

- Up until the end of the fifth series, the meter was a computer-animated image of an adventurer wearing a helmet. As lifeforce depletes, pieces of the helmet disappears from the meter, then the skin of the adventurer, and then the skull, until finally the eyes fly past the camera. The background color of the image also changes accordingly – green when healthy (helmet), amber when moderate (skin), and red when critical (skull). A remake of this meter was used in the one-off YouTube special.
- In the sixth and seventh series, the meter was represented by an animated picture of a walking knight, which loses pieces of its armour over time to reveal a skeleton that eventually collapses.
- In the final series, the meter was represented by a picture of a pie, where the slices reappear once the Dungeoneer puts food in their knapsack.

If the team manages to complete all three levels, they are awarded with their prize, which changed over the years of the show's history. Unlike most other children's shows, Knightmare had no qualms about having a very high difficulty level, and as a result, only eight teams managed to win the game over its eight series. Regardless of whether a team wins or fails, they leave the show once their game is over, and a new team takes their place. This continues until the final episode of the series, whereupon the last team playing in that episode will often always be given an impossible situation which they will fail, in order to allow the series to end. Since each episode is designed to be twenty-five minutes long, should a team's run exceed beyond an episode, editing is done to freeze the action towards the end, and then unfreeze at the beginning of the next episode (referred to in the series context as "temporal disruption"). Only twice in the entire series did temporal disruption coincide with the end of a quest (in series 2 and series 6 where both teams lost). The nature of the rolling gameplay being condensed into twenty-five minute episodes meant occasionally that the beginning of an episode would feature a team for a very short amount of time before they were eliminated. Conversely, some teams had barely started their quests when temporal disruption occurred.

=== Characters ===
A Saxon knight named Treguard of Dunshelm, was the dungeon master and was played by Hugo Myatt for the show's eight series. Information about his supposed background can be found in the related literature (see merchandise section). During the show, Treguard assisted the dungeoneer and the advisers, and also explained a team's cause of death whenever they died.

At first, Treguard directed the contestants on his own. However, from Series 4, Treguard had an assistant: Pickle the elf, played by David Learner, and (from Series 7) after Pickle had "gone back to the forest", Majida, a princess and genie of Arabian descent played by Jackie Sawiris. Majida originally said her name was "Daughter of the Setting Moon Whose Eyes are Like Daggers in the Hearts of Men Who Ride the Great Caravan of the Sultan". Both assistants gave additional support to teams, in particular younger adventurers who may have been nervous at the start of their quests.

During the early series, Treguard was portrayed as a neutral character, most notably between Series 1 and 3. At the start of Episode 14 of Series 3 (when no team had yet completed that series' dungeon), he went as far as to say "we're celebrating an unbeaten record", apparently siding against the dungeoneers. However, from Series 5 onwards, there was a clear distinction made between 'The Powers that Be' and 'The Opposition', against which Treguard became less neutral, and more inclined to aid the dungeoneers to complete their quest. Aside from Treguard, no other characters were featured throughout the entire run. Only warlock (later wizard and then mage) Hordriss and palace jester Motley would have long runs on the show, both being introduced in series 3 and remaining until the series end.

The formal division of characters between The Powers that Be and The Opposition meant later series started to feature more advanced story lines which would be hinted at in earlier quests and developed more as the series progressed. Examples of this include the alliance between Lord Fear and Aesandre in series 5, which backfires when she freezes the entire dungeon at the end of the series after her powers have been boosted by her ally. Series 6 saw Lord Fear attempt another alliance with Witch Queen Greystagg which she eventually rejected. As a result, Lord Fear summoned a Red Dragon to destroy the dungeon (which Treguard and Pickle ultimately foiled with a lightning rod the final team of that series retrieved), but this plan also failed, leading to the destruction of Mount Fear. In series 7, the enmity between Lord Fear and Greystagg developed further after it was revealed he had destroyed her home. Greystagg helps the final team retrieve a magic hammer to stop a giant troll from destroying Knightmare castle. In the final series, Greystagg had been replaced with the sorceress Maldame and both she and Lord Fear fought for control over an underwater domain called the Great Mire. Lord Fear sent another red dragon to destroy her, but the ultimate outcome of this was unresolved as the final quest ended. Over the course of the series, Treguard became known for his catchphrase "Ooh, nasty!", regularly used just after a team had died. Intended only as a passing remark, this was originally an ad lib by Myatt. Actors that auditioned for the show were required to demonstrate spontaneity and flexibility. Occasionally, a team's actions would require quick thinking by Hugo Myatt and/or the other actors in order for the gameplay to follow the planned path.

In its early series, Knightmare lacked a single major antagonist or 'baddie'. Originally, Treguard was specifically a neutral character, neither on the side of good nor evil. The closest there was to a main villain was Mogdred (portrayed by John Woodnutt), but his primary duty was (according to wizard Merlin in the penultimate episode of Series 2) to "scare you into making a mistake", though he did kill two dungeoneers, one in Series 2 and another early in Series 4. In Series 5 (1991), however, changes were made. Most of the characters were split into two sides: the righteous "Powers that Be", and the villainous "Opposition", the leader of which was Lord Fear played by Mark Knight. By this time, Treguard's stance had now fully evolved into that of a strictly good character.

In 2014, Hugo Myatt lent his "Treguard" voice to the heavy metal band Evil Scarecrow's album Galactic Hunt for the track Enter the Knightmare, whose lyrics are based on the 1980s TV show.

== Production ==
Knightmare was conceived by Tim Child in 1985, inspired by the two ZX Spectrum games Atic Atac and Dragontorc. Realising that if a ZX Spectrum could do these types of adventure games, then a television programme could revolutionise the genre. He enlisted the help of artist David Rowe to design realistic looking backgrounds with an airbrush. Borrowing the technique used in weather forecasts, Child devised a large blue room, which was set up in Studio A of Anglia Studios. The advanced computer graphic environments were created by the Travelling Matte Company using a £85,000 Supernova graphics system made by Spaceward Graphics. Travelling Matte was owned by set designer Robert Harris, who had trained at Central Saint Martin's in stage design and had been working with John Peyre at BBC TV when The Hitchhiker's Guide to the Galaxy started to blend digital images with real world studio scenery. Harris had a background in CGI, having trained in 3D animation at Middlesex Polytechnic under Dr John Vince, and experience in playing out "live" graphics for current affairs programmes like Newsnight and Panorama. Knightmare required CGI inserts and virtual lighting changes, door reveals and animated monsters in real time, within live action against blue screen using Ultimatte.

Eventually, in early 1986, a 15-minute pilot under the name of Dungeon Doom was recorded. Even at this stage it featured Hugo Myatt, the husband of Christine Webber who was a presenter of Anglia's regional news programme About Anglia. A second 20-minute pilot was filmed on 27 and 28 January 1987, with the name changed to Knightmare, and 'lifeforce' added, an idea borrowed from Atic Atac, which also influenced the show in other ways. He recruited Robert Harris, who used a Spaceward computer to design an animation of a knight's head that could indicate varying degrees of damage. Child sent this second pilot to the ITV Children's Committee in February, who commissioned a series of eight half-hour episodes.

The show was an instant success and a second series twice as long as the first was commissioned the next year, followed by a third the year after that. By the time this third series finished, Child felt the dungeon format was getting too restrictive, and he needed something new. Because of this, the fourth series saw the introduction of many 'outdoor' scenes, filmed around places such as medieval castles across the UK, and composited into the blue room using the chromakey technique. This series also saw the introduction of the "Eye Shield", which acted as an 'eye' for the dungeoneer. Using pre-recorded footage filmed on location, it followed the progress of the dungeoneers as they explored the dungeon. A new onscreen status bar was also introduced, generated by a Commodore Amiga 2000 computer.

At its peak during 1991/1992, Knightmare attracted approximately 4–5 million viewers per episode with many episodes being directed by Martin Cairns (at that time a very high figure for a children's TV series). By 1993, the year which featured the programme's seventh series, it was the most popular non-animated show on CITV. However, changes had recently occurred. Late in the previous year, the ITV Children's Committee was replaced by a single Controller of CITV, Dawn Airey. Although she thought well of Knightmare, the average audience age of CITV was now 6–10, down from 6–15 in 1985. It was believed the older audience was moving to satellite television and video games, and that programmes for a younger audience were needed. After two meetings, it was agreed that an 8th series of Knightmare would go ahead in 1994, but it would be a shorter run (ten episodes instead of fifteen or sixteen) and the rest of the series's timeslot would be taken by Virtually Impossible, a new virtual reality show from Broadsword, the same production company as Knightmare, and aimed at this younger audience. Shortly after this decision was made, Airey left for Channel 4, and was replaced as Controller by Vanessa Chapman.

Despite the diminishing older audience, Knightmare's eighth series performed well, and gained a higher audience than Virtually Impossible did later that autumn. Changes introduced in this series saw a return to the dungeon format of Series 1–3, albeit now completely computer-generated, and a new piece of dungeoneering equipment was added: the wand "Reach". This allowed dungeoneers to push, touch, and open things from a distance. At this point, there was still hope that Knightmare would return for a ninth series in 1995: a postal address for future contestants was displayed on screen after the end of the final episode. The chances of the eighth series being the last were also strong, however, and so the series ended on an ambiguous note.

In the event, Knightmare was 'rested' for the foreseeable future, partly due to the declining older audience, and partly because Tim Child felt that while Knightmare should employ high-quality virtual reality in order to remain a cutting-edge show, such technology was not affordable at the time.

=== Overseas versions ===
Two other versions of Knightmare were also made: one in France (Le Chevalier Du Labyrinthe), which ran from 19 September 1990 to 31 August 1991, and the other in Spain (El Rescate Del Talisman) which ran from 29 May 1991 to 1994. Both versions were sponsored by Sega. One of the primary differences with both international versions was that there was no rolling gameplay (i.e. each team/quest was completed in one episode) and prizes were awarded at the end of every episode.

In 1992, Tim Child and Broadsword attempted to sell the series to American broadcasters with a pilot called Lords of the Game. This pilot used characters, settings and the cast from series 6 excluding Hugo Myatt who was replaced with an American actor. There was little interest in the series, primarily due to the potential technical issues with using bluescreen/chromakey and an NTSC recording setup.

=== Merchandise ===
A number of items of Knightmare merchandise were produced over the show's run, including seven books written by Dave Morris:

- Knightmare: Can you beat the challenge? (ISBN 0-552-52540-5, 1988)
- The Labyrinths of Fear (ISBN 0-552-52608-8, 1989)
- Fortress of Assassins (ISBN 0-552-52638-X, 1990)
- The Sorcerer's Isle (ISBN 0-552-52714-9, 1991)
- The Forbidden Gate (ISBN 0-440-86317-1, 1992)
- The Dragon's Lair (ISBN 0-440-86328-7, 1993)
- Lord Fear's Domain (ISBN 0-440-86336-8, 1994)

The first of these, Knightmare, told the story of how Treguard came to inhabit Knightmare Castle, revealed once to have been Dunshelm Castle, which Treguard owned by birthright. The next four books were intended for older readers, and took the format of half-fiction, half-interactive story. In these, the first half of the book was a novelette about one of Treguard's adventures, serving as a lead-in to the second half which comprised numbered sections where the reader directed the narrative, similar to the Choose Your Own Adventure books. The next two books retained the interactive format, but were aimed at a younger audience. Throughout the interactive portions of the books, the reader had to keep track of Life Force and collected objects, and some books had additional statistics or special skills to monitor. Finally, Lord Fear's Domain was a puzzle book.

There were also two Knightmare computer games released. The first was released in 1987 on the ZX Spectrum, Commodore 64, Amstrad CPC, and Atari ST. The second was released in 1991 on the Amiga and Atari ST. A PC version was proposed for 1995, but the plan was abandoned when the series concluded. The latter game was an RPG similar to the Dungeon Master and Eye Of The Beholder games which, whilst well received at the time, had very little to do with the TV series besides the fantasy setting.

A Knightmare board game was also released in 1992, by MB Games.

== Transmissions ==
Series	Start date	End date	Episodes
1	7 September 1987	26 October 1987	8
2	5 September 1988	19 December 1988	16
3	8 September 1989	22 December 1989	16
4	7 September 1990	21 December 1990	16
5	6 September 1991	20 December 1991	16
6	11 September 1992	18 December 1992	15
7	10 September 1993	17 December 1993	15
8	9 September 1994	11 November 1994	10

=== Repeats ===
After Knightmare ended on ITV, it was quickly picked up by The Sci-Fi Channel, which broadcast all eight series starting from the channel's launch in November 1995. However, ratings were low, perhaps exacerbated by the satellite sharing that meant UK fans were unable to receive the Sci Fi Channel at the times when the show was being broadcast. Cable television was also relatively uncommon in the UK at this time, and completely unavailable in some areas, further limiting the show's existing fanbase. Sci-Fi's contract ran out on 31 October 1998. Knightmare's only appearances on television after that were as clips in "40 Years of Anglia" in 1999, and Channel 4's 100 Greatest Kids' TV Shows in 2001, where it came 16th, the highest position on the list for a game show.

In the United States, Series 5 and 6 were shown for a short time on local Long Island, New York independent station WLNY.

In December 2002, the UK satellite channel Challenge held a group of programmes called the "Christmas Cult Selection", featuring a group of classic game shows from the 1960s (The Golden Shot) right through to the 1980s. Knightmare was included in this, and the repeats started on 23 December 2002, with Series 3, Episode 1 preceded by a short 2.5-minute documentary featuring Tim Child and Hugo Myatt. Just over a week later, Knightmare went on to reach first place in an Internet poll held by Challenge, asking viewers to decide the best show out of the Cult Selection.

Reasonable ratings, combined with the high fanbase, ensured that the other seven series went on to be bought and shown over the next two years. It took until 8 July 2004 for all the episodes to be shown, when Episode 16 of Series 2 was broadcast 563 days after the repeats started. Knightmare continued to run on Challenge until 31 March 2007, when the rights to the series expired. By this time, only five of the eight series were still being repeated, as the rights to Series 3 expired at the end of 2004, Series 4 on 31 May 2006, and Series 5 on 30 September 2006, the latter two following a final showing of those series.

On 5 and 6 January 2013, the final two episodes from Series 7 were shown on the CITV channel as part of its 'Old Skool Weekend', which celebrated 30 years of ITV's programming block for children. According to Radio Times, Knightmare was the second most watched programme during the 'Old Skool Weekend', only being beaten by Fun House.

On 22 April 2013, Challenge announced that they reacquired the first two series of Knightmare. The rerun began its transmission on 10 May 2013 at 10:30pm, shown as part of their 'Late Zone' strand. These repeats now had the ITV Studios logo at the end rather than the Anglia logo. On 29 June 2015, Challenge announced that they had also reacquired the third and fourth series. The rerun started airing on 25 October 2015 at 10:00am.

== Further developments ==
=== Video game ===
Activision released a video game adaptation.

=== Knightmare VR ===
On 25 November 2002, only 6 days after the Challenge repeats were confirmed, it was announced that a reformat of Knightmare was to be undertaken by Televirtual, founded by Tim Child. Known as Knightmare VR, this would use avatar technology to place the dungeoneer in a full 3D computer generated world. A £40,000 National Lottery grant for the programme was awarded in July 2003.

In 2004, test images and clips continued to appear on the Televirtual website and on 17 August 2004, the 13-minute pilot was posted on the Internet.

The VR pilot kept most of the elements that appeared in the original show such as Wall Monsters, Clue Rooms and the gloomy dungeon setting. Original Knightmare actors Hugo Myatt and Mark Knight reprised their roles as Treguard and Lord Fear respectively, while several additional actors (including Nick Collett and Tim Child himself) were introduced to the cast.

The pilot introduced some fresh elements, including a new main host named Garstang, who was an orc. Treguard was now depicted as an avatar head who would sometimes appear to give the dungeoneer advice. The dungeoneer and all the in-dungeon characters were now fully computer generated, along with the rooms themselves, which meant that the dungeoneer could explore much larger and grander surroundings than previously seen. All of the rooms could now be seen more thoroughly from different camera angles, an element which the original programme was unable to do easily due to the limits of its technology.

The Helmet of Justice was no longer used, enabling the dungeoneer to now clearly see their surroundings. As a result of this, only one adviser was needed, instead of three.

Reactions to the pilot were mixed, with some saying the lack of a Helmet of Justice and the associated "guiding" element meant most of the essence of the original show was lost. The new theme was dismissed by some as being overly "cheesy" and unrelated to the dark sense of the programme. On 10 May 2005, it was announced that the project was to be shelved, with Child saying he had decided Knightmare would work best under a mixture of virtual reality and the original format.

In an interview with The Guardian in April 2013, Child said that although "there will always be hardcore fans clamouring for (Knightmare΄s) return; I think it's best to let it languish in its own deep, dark dungeon".

=== YouTube ===
In December 2012, lifelong Knightmare fan James Aukett commemorated 25 years since the first episode was shown with a documentary which featured interviews with Hugo Myatt, Tim Child, artist David Rowe (who illustrated the dungeon backgrounds for the earlier series) and various other actors and contestants who participated in Knightmare during the course of the show's eight series.

In August 2013, a one-off special edition of Knightmare was produced for YouTube's "Geek Week" event, directed and produced by Tim Child and featuring three original cast members – Hugo Myatt (Treguard), Mark Knight (Lord Fear) and Cliff Barry (Lissard), plus Knightmare VR actor Nick Collett and actresses Isy Suttie and Jessie Cave playing new roles. The team of dungeoneers were YouTube content creators Daniel Howell, Phil Lester, Emma Blackery and Stuart Ashen. Filming took place in Norwich at the original Anglia television studios.

=== Knightmare Live ===
A theatrical version of Knightmare was performed at the Edinburgh Festival Fringe from 23 July to 15 August 2013. It opened to rave reviews and was performed in London in 2013 and 2016. The show is produced by Objective Talent Management and stars Paul Flannery, Tom Bell and Amee Smith.

=== Convention ===
In March 2014, a group comprising the cast and crew of Knightmare and the website knightmare.com launched a successful crowdfunding campaign to raise money to run a Knightmare convention in the studios in Norwich where Knightmare was originally filmed. The convention took place at EPIC Studios in Norwich on 9–11 May 2014.

The convention allowed visitors to play a room of the Knightmare dungeon using the same technology used in the show, as well as to meet with some of the original cast. A copy of the American pilot Lord of the Game was also shown with an introduction by Tim Child.

== Cast ==
Character	Played by	Series
Treguard, the Dungeon Master	Hugo Myatt	1–8, VR, YouTube
Aesandre the Ice Queen	Juliet Henry-Massy	5
Ah Wok the Chinese Merchant (character uncredited)	Mark Knight	6
Bhal-Shebah the Red Dragon	Bill Cashmore (voice)	8
Brangwen the Wall Monster	Natasha Pope (voice)	
Brollachan	Anthony Donovan (voice)	7
Brother Mace the Tavern Monk	Michael Cule	4–5
Brother Strange the Proverbial Monk	Clifford Barry	7–8
Bumptious the Dwarf	Tom Karol	2
Captain Nemanor the Sailor	Adrian Neil	6
Casper the Key	Lawrence Werber (voice)	1–2
Cedric the Mad Monk	Lawrence Werber	1–2
Despair the Gargoyle	Nick Collett (voice)	VR
Dooreen and Dooris the Door Monsters (characters uncredited)	Zoe Loftin (voices)	4
Doorkis the Door Monster (character uncredited)	Michael Cule (voice)	4
Dreadnort the Robotic Knight	Clifford Norgate (voice)	6
Elita the Cavern Elf	Stephanie Hesp	5–6
Ellisandre the Elf Maid	Louise Milford (voice)	VR
Fatilla the Hun (character uncredited)	Michael Cule	4
Fidjit the Lock Master	Paul Valentine	7
Folly the Jester	Alec Westwood	1–2
The Gatekeeper	Michael Cule	5
Garstang The Orc	Tim Child (Voice) / Ben Child (Body)	VR, YouTube
Gibbet the Guard	Alec Westwood	1
Golgarach the Wall Monster	David Verrey (voice)	3
Granitas the Wall Monster	Guy Standeven (voice)	1–2
Gretel the Maiden	Audrey Jenkinson	2
Greystagg the Witch Queen	Iona Kennedy	6–7
Grimaldine the Celtic Wizard	Anthony Donovan	7
Guard	Tim Child	7–8
Gumboil the Knight	Edmund Dehn	1–2
Gundrada the Sword Mistress (character uncredited)	Samantha Perkins	4
Gwendoline The Green Warden	Juliet Henry-Massy	5
Heggatty the Witch	Stephanie Hesp	6
Honesty Bartram the Potion-Dealer	Bill Cashmore	8
Hordriss the Confuser	Clifford Norgate	3–8
Igneous the Wall Monster (character uncredited)	Edmund Dehn (voice)	2
Julius Scaramonger the Merchant	Rayner Bourton	5–6
Lillith the Sorceress	Mary Miller	1–2
Lissard the Atlantian	Cliff Barry	7–8, YouTube
Lord Fear the Techno-Sorcerer	Mark Knight	5–8, VR, YouTube
Majida the Genie	Jackie Sawiris	7–8
Maldame the Rival Sorceress	Iona Kennedy	8
Malice the Evil Sorceress (character uncredited)	Samantha Perkins	4
Marta the Waitress	Jacquelin Joyce	7
McGrew the Scotsman	David Verrey	3
Mellisandre the Maiden	Zoe Loftin	3–4
Merlin the Wizard	John Woodnutt	1–4
Mistress Goody the Hag (character uncredited)	Érin Geraghty	4
Mildread the Witch	Mary Miller	2
Mogdred the Dark Wizard	John Woodnutt	2–4
Morghanna the Dark Sorceress	Natasha Pope	3
Motley the Jester	Paul Valentine	3–6, 8
Mr. Grimwold the Ogre (character uncredited)	Bryan McNerney	3
Mrs. Grimwold the Hag	Tom Karol	3
Mugg the Gargoyle (character uncredited)	Edmund Dehn (voice)	1–2
Oakley the Tree Troll	Clifford Norgate (voice)	4–5
Olaf the Viking	Tom Karol	2–3
Olgarth the Wall Monster	Guy Standeven (voice)	1–2
Owen the Dragon (character uncredited)	Clifford Norgate (voice)	3
Pickle The Wood Elf	David Learner	4–6
Pixel the Pixie	Stephanie Hesp (voice)	5
Raptor the Pirate	Cliff Barry	7–8
Ridolfo the Troubadour	Adrian Neil	6
Romahna the Dragon Warden	Jacquelin Joyce	7
Rothberry the Apothecary	Mark Knight	7–8
Skarkill the Goblin Master	Rayner Bourton	5–6
Sidriss the Confused	Iona Kennedy	6–8
Sir Hugh de Wittless the Knight	Mark Knight	5
Smirkenorff the Dragon	Clifford Norgate (voice)	5–8
Snapper-Jack the Fool-Taker	Bill Cashmore	8
Stiletta the Warrior Thief	Joanne Heywood	8
Sylvester Hands the Thief	Paul Valentine	5–8
Sylvester the Jester	Nick Collett	YouTube
Theodora Snitch	Jessie Cave	YouTube
The Automatum	Edmund Dehn	2
The Behemoth (character uncredited)	Bryan McNerney	3
The Boatman	Paul Valentine	4–5
The Giant (character uncredited)	Edmund Dehn	1
The Talking Bird (character uncredited)	Tom Karol (Voice)	3
Troll	Guy Standeven	2
Velda the Elf Warrior	Natasha Pope	3
Veruca (aka Daisy)	Isy Suttie	YouTube

== See also ==
- Le Chevalier Du Labyrinthe, the French remake of this show
- El rescate del talismán, the Spanish adaptation of this show
