= Le Chevalier Du Labyrinthe =

French TV gameshow

- Presented by: Georges Beller
- Country of origin: France
- Original language: French
- No. of series: 1
- No. of episodes: 104

Production
- Running time: 30 minutes

Original release
- Network: Antenne 2
- Release: 19 September 1990 – 31 August 1991

Le Chevalier du labyrinthe (French for The Knight of the Labyrinth) is a French game show that aired for 104 episodes from 1990-1991 on Antenne 2. It was based on the British TV show Knightmare.

== Gameplay ==
Each episode would feature a team of four children (referred as knights). At the beginning of the game one member of the team would wear a helmet which blocked their vision. That child would then be sent into the labyrinth, a computer-generated maze made by Chromakey technology. The other three teammates acted guides, telling the child in the labyrinth what to do. Contestants would solve puzzles and riddles given by the labyrinth's various characters while accumulating knowledge for the final stage of the game. In the final stage the Knight in the labyrinth would remove their helmet and solve one last puzzle, against a time limit (represented by a bomb fuse). If solved, the contestant could release an enchanted sword and the team would receive a prize (during the first year, a Master System).

If the contestant made a mistake, such as walking into a virtual flame, they would "die". Then another member of the team would enter the labyrinth, wearing the helmet. If three members of the team "died", the team would lose.

== The Prizes ==
A Sega games console and a Chevalier du Labyrinthe board game.

== The Characters ==
- Le Maître du Château - The host of the show, whose name means "The Master of the Castle". He would occasionally give the team some advice. He was played by Georges Beller.
- Merlin- A wizard. He is the person that takes the teammates to the final challenge. But only if they answer two questions. He was played by René Lafleur.
- Crom- A monster who lived in the walls. He asked questions to the knights. Voiced by René Lafleur
- Laelith- The female version of Crom. Voiced by Chantal Garrigues.
- Mandragore- A witch, played by Chantal Garrigues.
- Tharock- An evil wizard. He hates Merlin and the Knights. He was played by René Lafleur
- Bouffon- A jester, played by Lionel Muzin.
- Iselle - a princess. She was Played by Véronique Moëst in season one, and Marine Jolivet in season two.
- Velda- A warrior who was also played by Véronique Moëst in season one, and Marine Jolivet in season two.
- Le corbeau - A crow who asked the knights riddles, voiced by Lionel Muzin.
- Tasdos- A skeleton, played by Lionel Muzin.
- Morgane- A fairy. She lets the team see Merlin, if they could correctly answer her questions. She was Played by Véronique Moëst in season one, and Marine Jolivet in season two.

== Merchandise ==
Milton Bradley made a board game based on the series. An EP that featured music from the show was released.

== See also ==
- Knightmare
- El Rescate Del Talisman
