= Hugo Myatt =

British actor (born 1945)

- Born: 13 September 1945 (age 81); Hendon, London, England
- Occupations: Actor; presenter; theatre director
- Years active: 1979–present
- Spouse: Christine Webber (divorced)

Hugo Myatt (born 13 September 1945) is a British actor, presenter and theatre director, best known for his role as the dungeon master Treguard in the children's game show Knightmare.

== Knightmare ==
Myatt played the role of Treguard of Dunshelm, the dungeon master and presenter of the Children's ITV game series Knightmare throughout all eight series, between 1987 and 1994.

Myatt met Tim Child, the creator of Knightmare, while Child was working as line producer on Anglia Television's regional news programme About Anglia with his wife, presenter Christine Webber. Child believed that Myatt was ideal for a dungeon master role, and arranged to make a pilot, Dungeon Doom. A few months after the first pilot a second pilot was made, which was renamed Knightmare. The second pilot was successful and a series was commissioned. Myatt's Treguard became the only character to appear throughout all 112 episodes that were made over Knightmare's eight series. Myatt ad-libbed some dialogue, with "Ooh, nasty!" becoming a series catchphrase.

In February 2004, Myatt reprised his role of Treguard for the first time in 10 years with a single appearance in the television series Dick and Dom in da Bungalow. Myatt remained locked in a cage for the entire production, and did not speak during the episode, except for a single line, "Ooh, nasty!", at the end. A few months later he returned to the role of Treguard once more with an appearance in the pilot episode of VR, an intended update of the original Knightmare television series. On this occasion Treguard's role was reduced: he was no longer the presenter of the show, and was present only as a disembodied avatar of Myatt that assisted the dungeoneer with snippets of advice. In 2013, he played Treguard again in a 2013 YouTube exclusive episode.

== Other roles ==
Myatt continued to appear in a variety of roles in television, movies, audio productions, computer games and pantomime. In 1996 he played the character of Stephanos in the Ancient Greece unit of the BBC Schools series Zig Zag, and in February 2000 he played "The Count" in an episode of the BBC television series ChuckleVision entitled "Out for the Count". He also provided several voices for the English version of the Dutch children's animated series Alfred J. Kwak.

Outside children's television, Myatt has produced numerous computer security training videos, and has appeared in a crime reconstruction on Crimewatch. In 2005, he appeared as Leon Bank in Snuff-Movie, and he also played the role of Bob Snatcher in the short film Snatching Time. In 2007 Myatt played the role of Mr Aston in The House on Straw Hill (also known as Rogue), and in 2010 he played the role of a vicar in Dead Cert. In 2016 Myatt appeared as the character "Dr Wilder" in "Bewilder Box" a live action, immersive escape room located in the seaside resort of Brighton.

Myatt has provided voices for a number of computer games including Black and White, Magic Carpet 2: The Netherworlds, and the original Fable where he provided the voice of the guild master Weaver. He has also performed roles for the Doctor Who audio dramas Omega, Weapon of Choice, A Blind Eye and Panacea (part of the Gallifrey audio series), and has also provided voice acting for the Sapphire & Steel audio drama The Passenger. He has more recently lent his voice to the Evil Scarecrow album Galactic Hunt in the song "Enter the Knightmare", which has lyrics based on Knightmare, and voiced General Khazimov in the mobile running game Zombies, Run!

== Filmography ==
=== Television ===
Year	Title	Role	Notes
1979	Park Ranger	Reverend Bultitude	Episode: "Fire!"
1987–1994	Knightmare	Treguard of Dunshelm, the dungeon master	112 episodes
1996	Strange but True?	Leading Seaman Articifer	Episode: "Life Beyond Death/The Haunted Bomber"
2000	ChuckleVision	Master	Episode: "Out for the Count"
2001	Life as We Know It	Vicar	Episode: "The Election"
2004	Dick and Dom in da Bungalow	Treguard	Episode: #3.45
2007	Children's TV on Trial	Himself	Episode: "1980s"
2012	30 Years of CITV	Himself	Television film

=== Film ===
Year	Title	Role	Notes
1999	Human Traffic	Taxi Driver	
2004	Strings	Hebalonian	
2005	Snuff-Movie	Leon Blanc	
2005	Red Mercury	PC Proctor	
2010	Dead Cert	Rev. Vester	
2013	Vendetta	Carter	
2013	The Shadow of Bigfoot	Richard Byrne	

=== Video games ===
Year	Title	Role	Notes
2001	Black & White	God	
2004	Fable	The Guildmaster (Weaver)	
2005	Fable: The Lost Chapters	Various	
2024	Cryptmaster	Orthos (voice)	

=== Audio ===
Year	Title	Role	Notes
2003	Doctor Who: The Monthly Adventures	Daland	Episode: "Omega"
2019	Geeky Retro News Show Pop Culture Podcast	Himself	Episode: "Hugo Myatt - Knightmare"
