= Tim Child =

British television producer

Tim Child (born 1946) is a British television producer. A former TV news reporter and later development producer at Anglia Television, he is most notable for creating and producing the cult children's television programme Knightmare, a fantasy role-playing adventure game which pioneered virtual studio or blue-screen production.

Child additionally created Time Busters a location-based role-playing game for BBC, which pioneered the use of wearable broadcast-quality cameras and later Cyberzone which has some claims to being the world's first virtual reality gameshow, also for BBC. Virtually Impossible was an ambitious parody of computer gaming for ITV, but failed to capture a loyal audience in the fashion of Knightmare.

As the CEO of Televirtual Ltd, Tim Child went on to lead a group of artists, animators and computer scientists producing advanced forms of communications technology, specifically avatars. The Televirtual team hold a number of awards for developing realtime animation techniques, and were also responsible for creating Britain's first fully-fledged Motion Capture Theatre. Tim Child remained at the helm of Televirtual and its successor, Intermedialab, for almost two decades, selling out his interests in the latter in 2009. He is currently Managing Director of DungeonMaster Ltd, and is active in producing for the Internet and the advancement of linguistic artificial intelligence in drama applications. Child also operates a TV and film drama development consultancy, more specifically by collaborating with authors to bring their works to the screen.
