= List of stage names: L =

This list of stage names lists names used by those in the entertainment industry, alphabetically by their stage name's surname (or the best approximation) followed by the given name (or the best approximation) where the surname begins with "L". One-word stage names are presented in List of one-word stage names.

Stage name	Birth name	Life	Notability	Notes
Big L	Lamont Coleman	1974–1999	American rapper and record executive	Also known as L Corleone
Julian L'Estrange	Julian Boyle	1880–1918	English actor	
Barbara La Marr	Reatha Dale Watson	1896–1926	American actress	
Totó la Momposina	Sonia Bazanta Vides	1940–2026	Colombian singer	
Pete La Roca	Peter Sims	1938–2012	American jazz drummer and attorney	Known later in his career as Pete "La Roca" Sims
T La Rock	Terrence Ronnie Keaton	1961–	American rapper	
De La Rose	Yuberkis Gabriela Marie de la Rosa Bryan	2001–	Puerto Rican singer and songwriter	
Rita La Roy	Ina La Roi Stuart	1901–1993	American actress	
Jack La Rue	Gaspere Biondilillo	1902–1984	American actor	
Patti LaBelle	Patricia Louise Holte	1944–	American singer and actress	
Art Laboe	Arthur Egnoian	1925–2022	American radio personality, songwriter and record producer	
Simon Lack	Alexander MacAlpine	1913–1980	Scottish actor	
Steve Lacy	Steven Norman Lackritz	1934–2004	American saxophonist	
Diane Ladd	Rose Diane Ladner	1935–2025	American actress	
Bert Lahr	Irving Lahrheim	1895–1967	American actor	
Cleo Laine	Clementine Dinah Bullock	1927–2025	English singer and actress	
Denny Laine	Brian Frederick Hines	1944–2023	English musician (The Moody Blues and Wings)	
Frankie Laine	Francesco Paolo LoVecchio	1913–2007	American singer, songwriter and actor	
Jenny Laird	Phyllis Edith Mary Blythe	1912–2001	English actress	
Arthur Lake	Arthur William Silverlake	1905–1987	American actor	
Florence Lake	Florence Silverlake	1904–1980	American actress	
Patricia Lake	Patricia Douras Van Cleve	1919–1993	American actress	
Veronica Lake	Constance Frances Marie Ockelman	1922–1973	American actress	
K. P. A. C. Lalitha	Maheshwari Amma	1947–2022	Indian actress	
Kendrick Lamar	Kendrick Lamar Duckworth	1987–	American rapper and songwriter	
Hedy Lamarr	Hedwig Eva Maria Kiesler	1914–2000	Austrian-American actress and inventor	
Mark Lambert	Mark Robert Luebke	1952–	American actor and singer	
Toni Lamond	Patricia Lamond Lawman	1932–2025	Australian singer, dancer, actress and comedian	
Dorothy Lamour	Mary Leta Dorothy Slaton	1914–1996	American actress and singer	
Peter Land	Peter Oliver White	1953–	New Zealand actor and singer	
David Lander	David Leonard Landau	1947–2020	American actor	
Carole Landis	Frances Lillian Mary Ridste	1919–1948	American actress	
Michael Landon	Eugene Michael Orowitz	1936–1991	American actor and filmmaker	
Abbe Lane	Abigail Francine Lassman	1932–2026	American singer and actress	
Allan Lane	Harry Leonard Albershardt	1909–1973	American actor	
Charles Lane	Charles Gerstle Levison	1905–2007	American actor	
Cristy Lane	Eleanor Johnston	1940–	American singer	
Don Lane	Morton Donald Isaacson	1933–2009	American-born talk show host and singer	
Jani Lane	John Kennedy Oswald	1964–2011	American singer and songwriter (Warrant)	
Jocelyn Lane	Jocelyn Olga Bolton	1937–	Austrian former actress and model	
Leota Lane	Leotabel Mullican	1903–1963	American actress and singer (Lane Sisters)	
Lola Lane	Dorothy Mullican	1906–1981	American actress and singer (Lane Sisters)	
Lupino Lane	Henry William George Lupino	1892–1959	English actor and comedian	
Mara Lane	Dorothy Bolton	1930–2014	Austrian-British actress	
Nathan Lane	Joseph Lane	1956–	American actor	
P. J. Lane	Phillip Jacob Isaacson	1984–	Australian singer and actor	
Priscilla Lane	Priscilla Mullican	1915–1995	American actress and singer (Lane Sisters)	
Rosemary Lane	Rosemary Mullican	1913–1974	American actress and singer (Lane Sisters)	
Tory Lanez	Daystar Shemuel Shua Peterson	1992–	Canadian singer and rapper	
Eddie Lang	Salvatore Massaro	1902–1933	American musician	
Howard Lang	Donald Yarranton	1911–1989	English actor	
Jim Lang	Jim Langknecht	1950–	American composer	
Jonny Lang	Jon Langseth Jr.	1981–	American singer, songwriter and musician	
June Lang	Winifred June Vlasek	1917–2005	American actress	
Sue Ane Langdon	Sue Lookhoff	1936–	American actress	
El Langui	Juan Manuel Montilla Macarrón	1979–	Spanish rapper and actor	
Susan Lanier	Susan Engledow	1947–	American actress	
Joi Lansing	Joy Brown	1929–1972	American actress	
Robert Lansing	Robert Brown	1928–1994	American actor	
Sherry Lansing	Sherry Duhl	1944–	American retired film studio executive	
Snooky Lanson	Roy Landman	1914–1990	American singer	
Alexandra Lara	Alexandra Plătăreanu	1978–	Romanian-German actress	
Catherine Lara	Catherine Bodet	1945–	French musician, composer, singer and author	
Odete Lara	Odete Bertoluzzi	1929–2015	Brazilian actress	
Eddie Large	Edward McGinnis	1941–2020	Scottish comedian (Little and Large)	
Chris Larkin	Christopher Larkin Stephens	1967–	English actor	
Keith Larsen	Keith Burt	1924–2006	American actor	
Wolf Larson	Wolfgang von Wyszecki	1959–	German-Canadian former actor, screenwriter and producer	
Stoney LaRue	Stoney Phillips	1977–	American musician	
Baby Lasagna	Marko Purišić	1995–	Croatian singer-songwriter and music producer	
Denise LaSalle	Ora Denise Allen	1934–2018	American singer	
Bat for Lashes	Natasha Khan	1979–	English singer and songwriter	
Zoe Laskari	Zoe Kourouklis	1942–2017	Greek actress	
Barbara Lass	Barbara Kwiatkowska	1940–1995	Polish actress	
James Last	Hans Last	1929–2015	German composer and big band leader	Also known as Hansi
Queen Latifah	Dana Owens	1970–	American rapper, actress and singer	
Matthew Laurance	Matthew Dickoff		American actor	
Stan Laurel	Arthur Stanley Jefferson	1890–1965	English comedian and actor (Laurel and Hardy)	
Rose Laurens	Rose Podwojny	1951–2018	French singer-songwriter	
Paul Laurence	Paul Lawrence Jones III	1958–	American songwriter, producer and musician	
Piper Laurie	Rosetta Jacobs	1932–2023	American actress	
Jon Laurimore	Jon St Alban Livermore	1936–	English actor	
Ève Lavallière	Eugénie Fenoglio	1866–1929	French actress	
Lea Laven	Lea Luukinen	1948–	Finnish singer	
Daliah Lavi	Daliah Lewinbuk (or Levenbuch)	1942–2017	Israeli actress, singer and model	
Blackie Lawless	Steven Duren	1956–	American singer, songwriter and musician (W.A.S.P.)	
Andrew Lawrence	Andrew Mignogna	1988–	American actor, filmmaker, podcaster and singer	
Carol Lawrence	Carolina Laraia	1932–	American actress	
Eddie Lawrence	Lawrence Eisler	1919–2014	American actor	
Gertrude Lawrence	Gertrude Klasen	1898–1952	English actress, singer and dancer	
Jay Lawrence	Jay Storch	1924–1987	American comedian and actor	
Joey Lawrence	Joseph Lawrence Mignona III	1976–	American actor, musician and singer-songwriter	
Matthew Lawrence	Matthew Mignogna	1980–	American actor, podcaster and singer	
Steve Lawrence	Sidney Liebowitz	1935–2024	American actor, singer and comedian	
Vicki Lawrence	Vicki Axelrad	1949–	American actress, comedienne and singer	
Priscilla Lawson	Priscilla Shortridge	1914–1958	American actress	
Dorothy Layton	Dorothy Wannenwetsch	1912–2009	American actress	
Valentin le désossé	Jacques Renaudin	1843–1907	French dancer	
Barbara Lea	Barbara LeCocq	1929–2011	American singer	
Nicholas Lea	Nicholas Herbert	1962–	Canadian actor	
Leo Leandros	Leandros Papathanasiou	1923–2025	Greek musician, composer and producer	
Vicky Leandros	Vassiliki Papathanasiou	1949–	Greek-German singer	
Ginette Leclerc	Geneviève Menut	1912–1992	French actress	
Inda Ledesma	Margarita Rodríguez	1926–2010	Argentine actress	
Amos Lee	Ryan Massaro	1977–	American singer-songwriter	
Anna Lee	Joan Boniface Winnifrith	1913–2004	English actress	
Brenda Lee	Brenda Tarpley	1944–	American singer	
Bruce Lee	Jun-Fan Lee	1940–1973	Hong Kong-American martial artist and actor	
Bunny Lee	Edward O'Sullivan Lee	1941–2020	Jamaican record producer	Also known as Striker Lee
Dianne Lee	Dianne Littlehales		English singer and actress	
Dinah Lee	Diane Jacobs	1943–	New Zealand singer	
Dixie Lee	Wilma Wyatt	1909–1952	American actress, dancer and singer	
Dorothy Lee	Majorie Millsap	1911–1999	American actress and comedienne	
Frances Lee	Merna Tibbetts	1906–2000	American actress	
Geddy Lee	Gary Lee Weinrib	1953–	Canadian musician (Rush)	
Georgia Lee	Ramer Lyra Pitt	1921–2010	Australian singer and actress	
Gwen Lee	Gwendolyn Lepinski	1904–1961	American actress	
Gypsy Rose Lee	Rose Louise Hovick	1911–1970	American burlesque entertainer, stripper, actress, author, playwright and vedette	
Hyapatia Lee	Victoria Lynch	1960–	American former pornographic actress	
Keiran Lee	Adam Diksa	1984–	English pornographic actor, director, and producer	
Lila Lee	Augusta Wilhelmena Fredericka Appel	1905–1973	American actress	
Madeline Lee	Madeline Lederman	1923–2008	American actress and activist	
Mary Lee	Mary Lee Wooters	1924–1996	American singer and actress	
Michele Lee	Michele Lee Dusick	1942–	American actress, singer, dancer, producer and director	
Peggy Lee	Norma Deloris Egstrom	1920–2002	American singer, songwriter, composer and actress	
Pinky Lee	Pincus Leff	1907–1993	American comedian and actor	
Ruta Lee	Ruta Kilmonis	1935–	Canadian-American actress and dancer	
St. Clair Lee	Bernard Henderson	1944–2011	American singer (The Hues Corporation)	
Sondra Lee	Sondra Gash	1930–2026	American former actress and dancer	
Stagga Lee	Eric Newman	1975–	American rapper and DJ	
Stan Lee	Stanley Lieber	1922–2018	American comic book writer	
Richard Leech	Richard Leeper McClelland	1922–2004	Irish actor	
Andrea Leeds	Antoinette Lees	1913–1984	American actress	
Lila Leeds	Lila Wilkinson	1928–1999	American actress	
John Leeson	John Ducker	1943–	English actor	
John Legend	John Stephens	1978–	American singer, songwriter, musician and record producer	
Mirtha Legrand	Rosa Martínez Suárez	1927–	Argentine actress and television presenter	
Silvia Legrand	María Aurelia Paula Martínez Suárez	1927–2020	Argentine actress	
Chyler Leigh	Chyler Leigh Potts	1982–	American actress, singer and model	
Dorian Leigh	Dorian Leigh Parker	1917–2008	American model	
Janet Leigh	Jeanette Morrison	1927–2004	American actress	
Jennifer Jason Leigh	Jennifer Leigh Morrow	1962–	American actress	
Megan Leigh	Michelle Schei	1964–1990	American pornographic dancer and actress	
Mitch Leigh	Irwin Michnick	1928–2014	American composer and producer	
Suzanna Leigh	Sandra Smith	1945–2017	English actress	
Jan Leighton	Milton Lichtman	1921–2009	American actor	
Lillian Leitzel	Leopoldina Alitza Pelikan	1892–1931	German-American acrobat	
Mr. Len	Leonard Smythe	Unknown	American hip hop DJ	
Ravyn Lenae	Ravyn Lenae Washington	1999–	American singer-songwriter	
Marcelle Lender	Anne-Marie Marcelle Bastien	1862–1926	French singer, dancer and entertainer	
Ari Lennox	Courtney Salter	1991–	American singer	
Dan Leno	George Galvin	1860–1904	English comedian and actor	
Rula Lenska	Róża Łubieńska	1947–	English actress	
Lotte Lenya	Karoline Wilhelmine Charlotte Blamauer	1898–1981	Austrian singer and actress	
Jack E. Leonard	Leonard Lebitzky	1910–1973	American comedian and actor	
Queenie Leonard	Pearl Walker	1905–2002	English actress	
Sheldon Leonard	Leonard Sheldon Bershad	1907–1997	American actor, producer, director and screenwriter	
Sunny Leone	Karenjit Kaur Vohra	1981–	Canadian-American actress, model and former pornographic actress	
Tommy Leonetti	Nicola Tomaso Lionetti	1929–1979	American singer-songwriter and actor	
Téa Leoni	Elizabeth Téa Pantaleoni	1966–	American actress	
Mimi Lerner	Emilia Lipczer	1945–2007	Polish-American opera singer	
Baby LeRoy	Ronald Le Roy Overcracker	1932–2001	American actor	
Da L.E.S	Leslie Jonathan Mampe Jr.	1985–	South African-American rapper	
Lady Leshurr	Melesha Katrina O'Garro	1987–	British rapper, singer, songwriter and producer	
Amy Leslie	Lilian West	1855–1939	American actress and opera singer	
Joan Leslie	Joan Agnes Theresa Sadie Brodel	1925–2015	American actress	
John Leslie	John Leslie Nuzzo	1945–2010	American pornographic actor	
Ketty Lester	Revoyda Frierson	1934–	American actress and singer	
Mark Lester	Mark Letzer	1958–	English former child actor	
Richard Lester	Richard Lester Liebman	1932–	American director	
Gigi Leung	Wing-kei Leung	1976–	Hong Kong actress and singer	
John Levene	John Anthony Woods	1941–	English actor, producer, entertainer and singer	
Johnny Lever	John Prakash Rao Janumala	1957–	Indian actor	
Zachary Levi	Zachary Levi Pugh	1980–	American actor	
Al Lewis	Albert Meister	1923–2006	American actor	
Gary Lewis	Gary Harold Lee Levitch	1945–	American musician (Gary Lewis & the Playboys)	
Gary Lewis	Gary Stevenson	1957–	Scottish actor	
Huey Lewis	Hugh Cregg III	1950–	American singer, songwriter and actor (Huey Lewis and the News)	
Jayce Lewis	Jason Lewis	1984–	Welsh musician	
Jerry Lewis	Jerome Levitch	1926–2017	American comedian, actor and singer	
Joe E. Lewis	Joseph Klewan	1902–1971	American singer	
Linda Lewis	Linda Fredericks	1950–2023	English singer	
Mel Lewis	Melvin Sokoloff	1929–1990	American musician	
Robert Q. Lewis	Robert Goldberg	1921–1991	American actor, radio presenter and comedian	
Shari Lewis	Sonia Hurwitz	1933–1994	American puppeteer, actress and writer	
Smiley Lewis	Overton Lemons	1913–1966	American blues musician	
Ted Lewis	Theodore Friedman	1890–1971	American entertainer, bandleader and musician	
Val Lewton	Vladimir Leventon	1904–1951	Russian-American novelist, film producer and screenwriter	
Jet Li	Lian-Jie Li	1963–	Chinese actor, producer and martial artist	
Lykke Li	Li Lykke Timotej Zachrisson	1986–	Swedish singer	
Danielle Licari	Danielle Cuvillier	1936–	French singer	
Mr. Lif	Jeffrey Haynes	1977–	American rapper	
Alex Lifeson	Aleksandar Živoyinović	1953–	Canadian musician (Rush)	
Judith Light	Judith Licht	1949–	American actress	
Winnie Lightner	Winifred Reeves	1899–1971	American actress	
Bjarne Liller	Bjarne Pedersen	1935–1993	Danish jazz musician and singer-songwriter	
Roger Lima	Rogério Lima Manganelli	1973–	American musician (Less Than Jake)	
Rickey Lime	Anna Goodling	1980–	American musician (Scarling)	
Paul Lincke	Carl Emil Paul Lincke	1866–1946	German composer and theater conductor	
Abbey Lincoln	Anna Wooldridge	1930–2010	American singer, songwriter and actress	
Andrew Lincoln	Andrew Clutterbuck	1973–	English actor	
Elmo Lincoln	Otto Elmo Linkenhelt	1889–1952	American actor	
Henry Lincoln	Henry Soskin	1930–2022	English author and actor	
Pamela Lincoln	Pamela Gill	1937–2019	American actress	
Anita Linda	Alice Lake	1924–2020	Filipina actress	
Hal Linden	Harold Lipschitz	1931–	American actor	
Max Linder	Gabriel-Maximillien Leuvielle	1883–1925	French actor	
Howard Lindsay	Herman Nelke	1889–1968	American playwright, director and actor	
Margaret Lindsay	Margaret Kies	1910–1981	American actress	
Lisa Lisa	Lisa Velez	1967–	American singer	
Mona Lisa (actress)	Gloria Lerma Yatco	1922–2019	Filipina actress	
Mona Lisa (singer)	Kimberly Leadbetter	1979–	American singer	
Virna Lisi	Virna Lisa Pieralisi	1936–2014	Italian actress	
Ann Little	Mary Brooks	1891–1984	American actress	
Little Jack Little	John Leonard	1899–1956	English-American composer, singer and actor	
Syd Little	Cyril Mead	1942–	English comedian (Little and Large)	
Eddie Little Sky	Edsel Little	1926–1997	American actor	
Félia Litvinne	François-Jeanne Schütz	1860–1936	French opera singer	
Larry Livermore	Lawrence Hayes	1947–	American singer, musician, record producer and author	
Bunny Livingston	Neville Livingston	1947–2021	Jamaican musician (Bob Marley and the Wailers)	
Jay Livingston	Jacob Levenson	1915–2001	American actor	
Mary Livingstone	Sadie Marcowitz	1905–1983	American actress and comedienne	
Olivia Anna Livki	Olivia Anna Schnitzler	1984–	German singer-songwriter	
Emma Livry	Emma Marie Emarot	1842–1863	French dancer	
Raymond Llewellyn	Raymond Llewellyn Jones	1928–2026	Welsh actor	
Kathleen Lloyd	Kathleen Gackle	1948–	American actress	
Marie Lloyd	Matilda Wood	1870–1922	English performer and comedienne	
Norman Lloyd	Norman Perlmutter	1914–2021	American actor	
Shawty Lo	Carlos Walker	1976–2016	American rapper (D4L)	
Meat Loaf	Marvin Lee Aday	1947–2022	American singer and actor	
Tone Loc	Anthony Smith	1966–	American rapper	
Jon Locke	Joseph Yon	1927–2013	American actor	
Josef Locke	Joseph McLaughlin	1917–1999	Irish singer	
Sondra Locke	Sandra Smith	1944–2018	American actress	
Gary Lockwood	John Gary Yurosek	1937–	American actor	
John Loder	William John Muir Lowe	1898–1988	English actor	
Ella Logan	Georgina Armour Allan	1913–1969	Scottish-American actress and singer	
Jimmy Logan	James Allan Short	1928–2001	Scottish performer and director	
Johnny Logan	Seán Patrick Michael Sherrard	1954–	Irish singer-songwriter	
Lora Logic	Susan Whitby	c. 1960	British saxophonist, singer and songwriter (X-Ray Spex)	
Herbert Lom	Herbert ze Kuchačevič ze Schluderpacheru	1917–2012	Czech-English actor	
Carole Lombard	Jane Alice Peters	1908–1942	American actress	
Louise Lombard	Louise Perkins	1970–	English actress	
Alice Lon	Alice Lon Wyche	1926–1981	American singer and dancer	
David London	Dennis Frederiksen	1951–2014	American singer	
George London	George Burnstein	1920–1985	American opera singer	
Julie London	Julie Peck	1926–2000	American actress and singer	
John Lone	Kwok-Leung Ng	1952–	American actor	
Muni Long	Priscilla Hamilton	1988–	American singer and songwriter	
Cachorro López	Gerardo Horacio López von Linden	1956–	Argentine record producer, musician and songwriter	
Jack Lord	John Joseph Patrick Ryan	1920–1998	American actor	
Justine Lord	Jennifer Lily Schooling	1937–	English actress	
Marjorie Lord	Marjorie Wollenberg	1918–2015	American actress	
Mr Lordi	Tomi Putaansuu	1974–	Finnish musician	
Traci Lords	Nora Louise Kuzma	1968–	American actress	
Yoke Lore	Adrian Galvin	1989–	American musician	
Sophia Loren	Sofia Costanza Brigida Villani Scicolone	1934–	Italian actress	
Trey Lorenz	Lloyd Lorenz Smith	1969–	American singer-songwriter	
Eugene Loring	LeRoy Kerpestein	1911–1982	American dancer and choreographer	
Gloria Loring	Gloria Jean Goff	1946–	American singer, songwriter and actress	
Lisa Loring	Lisa Ann DeCinces	1958–2023	American actress	
Teala Loring	Marcia Eloise Griffin	1922–2007	American actress	
Guido Lorraine	Gwidon Alfred Gottlieb	1912–2009	Polish actor, musician and singer	
Louise Lorraine	Louise Escobar	1904–1981	American actress	
Peter Lorre	László Löwenstein	1904–1964	Hungarian-American actor	
Marion Lorne	Marion Lorne MacDougall	1883–1968	American actress	
Joan Lorring	Madeline Ellis	1926–2014	American actress	
Lucille Lortel	Lucille Wadler	1900–1999	American actress	
Pixie Lott	Victoria Louise Lott	1991–	English singer, songwriter and actress	
Helmut Lotti	Helmut Lotigiers	1969–	Belgian singer-songwriter	
Bonnie Lou	Mary Kath	1924–2015	American singer	
Jean Louis	Jean Louis Berthault	1907–1997	French-American costume designer	
Justin Louis	Louis Ferreira	1966–	Portuguese-Canadian actor	
Anita Louise	Anita Louise Fremault	1915–1970	American actress	
Merle Louise	Merle Louise Letowt	1934–2025	American actress	
Tina Louise	Tina Blacker	1934–	American actress	
Michel Louvain	Michel Poulin	1937–2021	Canadian singer	
Charlie Louvin	Charles Loudermilk	1927–2011	American country singer and songwriter (The Louvin Brothers)	
Ira Louvin	Ira Loudermilk	1924–1965	American country singer, musician and songwriter (The Louvin Brothers)	
Abz Love	Richard Abidin Breen	1979–	English rapper, singer, songwriter, producer and television personality (Five)	
Bessie Love	Juanita Horton	1898–1986	American-English actress	
Brandi Love	Tracey Lynn Livermore	1973–	American pornographic actress	
Darlene Love	Darlene Wright	1941–	American singer and actress	
Faizon Love	Langston Faizon Santisima	1968–	Cuban-American actor and comedian	
G. Love	Garrett Dutton	1972–	American musician (G. Love & Special Sauce)	
Mary Love	Mary Ann Varney	1943–2013	American singer	Also known as Mary Love Comer
Monie Love	Simone Gooden	1970–	English rapper, actress and radio personality	Also known as Simone Johnson
Linda Lovelace	Linda Susan Boreman	1949–2002	American pornographic actress	
Patty Loveless	Patricia Lee Ramey	1957–	American country singer	
Ed Lover	James Roberts	1963–	American rapper	
Lene Lovich	Lili-Marlene Premilovich	1949–	English-American musician	
Robert Lowery	Robert Lowery Hanks	1913–1971	American actor	
Philip Lowrie	Colin Lowrie	1936–2025	English actor	
Myrna Loy	Myrna Adele Williams	1905–1993	American actress	
Antonella Lualdi	Antonietta de Pascale	1931–2023	Italian actress	
Emmanuel Lubezki	Emmanuel Lubezki Morgenstern	1964–	Mexican cinematographer	
Arthur Lucan	Arthur Towle	1885–1954	English actor	
Michael Lucas	Andrei Lvovich Treivas	1972–	Russian-born American businessman, pornographic actor and director	Also known as Ramzes Kairoff and Michel Lucas
Nick Lucas	Dominic Nicholas Anthony Lucanese	1897–1982	American musician and singer	
Sid Lucero	Timothy Eigenmann	1983–	Filipino actor	
Lex Luger	Lexus Lewis	1991–	American record producer	
Bela Lugosi	Béla Blasko	1882–1956	Hungarian-American actor	
Aca Lukas	Aleskandar Vuksanović	1968–	Serbian singer and musician	
Lydia Lunch	Lydia Anne Koch	1959–	American singer (Teenage Jesus and the Jerks)	
Alberto Lupo	Alberto Zoboli	1924–1984	Italian actor	
Virginia Luque	Violeta Domínguez	1927–2014	Argentine singer and actress	
Ingrid Luterkort	Carola Ingrid Margareta Eklundh	1910–2011	Swedish actress	
Lillian Lux	Lilian Lukashefsky	1918–2005	American singer, author, songwriter and actress	
Annabella Lwin	Myant Aye	1966–	Burmese-English singer, songwriter and record producer (Bow Wow Wow)	
Abe Lyman	Abraham Simon	1897–1957	American bandleader	
Dawn Lyn	Dawn Lyn Narvik	1963–	American former child actress	
Jacquie Lyn	Jacquelyn Dufton	1928–2002	English-American child actress	
Carol Lynley	Carole Ann Jones	1942–2019	American actress	
Amber Lynn	Laura Lynn Allen	1964–	American pornographic actress	
Cassandra Lynn	Cassandra Lynn Jensen	1979–2014	American model	
Cynthia Lynn	Zinta Zimilis	1937–2014	Latvian-American actress	
Diana Lynn	Dolores Loehr	1926–1971	American actress	
Ginger Lynn	Ginger Lynn Allen	1962–	American pornographic actress	
Jeffrey Lynn	Ragnar Godfrey Lind	1905/1906–1989	American actor and producer	
Judy Lynn	Judy Lynn Voiten	1936–2010	American singer-songwriter	
Porsche Lynn	Unknown	1962–	American pornographic actress	
Sharon Lynn	D'Auvergne Sharon Lindsay	1901–1963	American actress and singer	
Carole Lynne	Helen Violet Carolyn Heyman	1918–2008	English actress	
Gillian Lynne	Gillian Barbara Pyrke	1926–2018	English ballerina	
Gloria Lynne	Gloria Wilson	1929–2013	American jazz singer	
Lya Lys	Natalia Lyecht	1908–1986	German-American actress	
MC Lyte	Lana Moorer	1970–	American rapper	
Natasha Lyonne	Natasha Braustein	1979–	American actress and filmmaker	
Natasha Lytess	Natalia Postmann	1911–1963	German actress and writer	
