= Rex the Runt =

British-Danish animated stop motion comedy television series

- Main characters from left to right: Vince, Wendy, Bad Bob, Rex
- Genre: adult animation animated sitcom surreal comedy
- Created by: Richard Goleszowski
- Written by: Richard Goleszowski; Alan Gilbey; Kevin Wrench; Andrew Franks; David Max Freedman; Andrew Viner; Peter Holmes; Ben Caudell; Ben Seymour
- Directed by: Richard Goleszowski; Dan Capozzi; Peter Peake; Christopher Sadler; Sam Fell
- Creative directors: Peter Holmes; Richard Goleszowski
- Voices of: Elisabeth Hadley; Paul Merton; Steve Box; Arthur Smith; Andrew Franks (series 1); Kevin Wrench (series 1); Colin Rote (series 2); Andy Jeffers (series 2)
- Theme music composer: Stuart Gordon
- Opening theme: "Rex the Runt" by Kevin Wrench; Andrew Franks
- Ending theme: "Rex the Runt" by Kevin Wrench; Andrew Franks
- Composers: Stuart Gordon; Ben Jones
- Countries of origin: United Kingdom; Denmark
- Original language: English
- No. of series: 2
- No. of episodes: 26; 3 (pilots)

Production
- Executive producers: Michael Rose; Peter Lord; David Sproxton; Colin Rose; Paul Kofod; Ulla Brockenhuus-Schack (series 1); Mikael Shields (series 1); Steve Walsh (series 1); Tom Van Waveren (series 2)
- Producers: Michael Rose (series); Jacqueline White
- Production location: Bristol
- Cinematography: Frank Passingham; Fred Reed; Andy MacCormack; Chris Maris
- Editors: Ben Jones (dubbing); James Mather (dubbing); Jane Hicks; Andrew Ward (series 1); Sheri Galloway (series 2); Tim Bolt (online); Nick Brooks (online, series 1)
- Running time: 9 minutes
- Production companies: Aardman Animations; Egmont Imagination; BBC Bristol; EVA Entertainment (series 1)

Original release
- Network: BBC Two (1998–2001); BBC Four (2005)
- Release: 21 December 1998 – 19 April 2005

Rex the Runt is a British-Danish adult stop-motion animated comedy television series primarily consisting of a television show and two short films produced by Aardman Animations and Egmont Imagination for BBC Bristol, with EVA Entertainment co-producing the first series. Its main characters are four plasticine dogs: Rex, Wendy, Bad Bob and Vince.

Rex was first introduced as a minor character in Ident (1989), a short film directed by Richard Starzak for the Lip Synch series. During the seven years of development of the characters, Starzak produced three pilots, subtitled How Dinosaurs Became Extinct (1991), Dreams (1991) and North by North Pole (1996). The 1991 pilots were unknown to the Aardman crew at the time, as Starzak created them during his free time. Because of this, the series wasn't pitched until the discovery of these shorts a year later, as the team found potential to turn these shorts into a full-fledged series.

Thirteen ten-minute episodes of the series aired over two weeks on BBC Two from December 1998. A second, thirteen-episode series aired from September 2001 on the same channel. As well as the core cast, guest voices included Paul Merton, Morwenna Banks, Judith Chalmers, Antoine de Caunes, Bob Holness, Simon Day, Bob Monkhouse, Jonathan Ross, Graham Norton, Arthur Smith, June Whitfield, Kathy Burke, Pam Ayres and Eddie Izzard.

The series also used to air on Gold, Dave and Watch.

The animation is unusual in that the models are almost two-dimensional and are animated to exaggerate this – they are flattened in appearance and animated on a sheet of glass with the backgrounds behind the sheet. This would be altered in the second series, as the models would become more three-dimensional.

== Characters ==
=== Main ===
- Rex, the protagonist – a timid, irritable runt. He is quick-witted and usually comes up with plans to get out of the scrapes the gang finds themselves in. However, he can also annoy the others by being a smart aleck. His favourite superhero is Rocket Raymond. He is the leader of the gang, even having his name, Rex, translating to "King" in Latin.
- Bad Bob is a "big, fat slob", interested in food and TV. His friends, and occasionally even he himself, describe him as a "Big, fat, jelly-wobbly, fat bastard", usually getting cut off towards the end. He is distinguishable by his eye patch, which changes from eye to eye, and often carries around a revolver almost the size of himself. However grumpy he might be, he is intelligent and loyal. Bad Bob is also known to build unique gadgets and inventions out of knick-knacks and everyday household objects, such as using an empty can of beans as a form of time machine.
- Wendy is the only female housemate, distinguishable by her eyelashes, pink colour, noticeably hemispheric breasts, and wears a red (or starting with series 2, pink) bow on her head. She is cynical, sarcastic, and fiercely independent. Wendy provides solutions to problems albeit in a distant or non-caring way. She speaks in a Mancunian accent.
- Vince is the pet of the household, although all four are dogs. He is distinguished by his prominent buckteeth and mismatched eyes. He speaks in single words or short disjointed phrases, his favourites being "Spaghetti", "Tuesday", "Jam", and "Trousers". Vince suffers from "Random Pavarotti Disease", causing him to randomly blurt out snatches of opera. While he appears to be unintelligent, he occasionally shows great ingenuity, for example by building an elaborate Heath Robinson machine designed to kill a mouse. The other members of the gang often respond to Vince's random outbursts by irritably telling him to "shut it". Vince often has a habit of copying what others have said, sometimes even if they have just said it in their minds, which Bad Bob finds really annoying.

=== Others ===
Many one-off and recurring characters in Rex The Runt are voiced by various well-known British celebrities. These include:

- Doctor Dogg is a medical doctor. Moustachioed, complacent and greedy, he's an opportunistic money-grabber, whose habitual charge for any treatment is "ten quid" – regardless of whether the cure works or does more harm than good. He isn't above using the main characters in medical research. Voiced by Paul Merton.
- Arthur Dustcart, another semi-regular character, who first makes an appearance in the last episode of the first series, but appears quite frequently in the second. He is an ugly but experienced dustman, sporting sleepy mismatched eyes, a neckerchief, a pair of dirty underpants and a large nose with prominent nasal hair. Despite his grotesque appearance and smell, he and Wendy get on rather well, much to the annoyance of Rex. He becomes a friend of the household when he helps find Rex after he was turned into spaghetti. Voiced by Arthur Smith.
- Mrs. Bloomers, head of Kumfy Kennels. Treats dogs with care, until she put Vince in the kennel and he ate a chihuahua. Voiced by Morwenna Banks.
- Judith Poodle, hostess of a holiday program. Usually ends her sentences with "Ruff!". Voiced by Judith Chalmers.
- Mr. Formal, the Runts' bank manager, until Bad Bob brought his gun and made him think they were bank robbers. Voiced by Bob Holness.
- Melting Blob Man, a three-year-old, but very smart slime creature who warned the Runts about the black hole.
- Constable Funnyname, a police dog who arrests Wendy in "The Trials of Wendy". Voiced by Simon Day.
- Judge Pikelet, elderly judge in "The Trials of Wendy". Voiced by June Whitfield
- Kylie Mandlebrotska, Rex's old maths teacher, until she fell into the black hole. Voiced by Kathy Burke.
- Easter Island Aliens, three space aliens from the planet Thribb, where the people look like the Moai statues from Easter Island. Voiced by Eddie Izzard.
- Morris the One-Gloved Mouse, invaded Rex's kitchen in "Mouse In Me Kitchen". Voiced by Phill Jupitus.
- Osvaldo Halitosis, a moustached plasticine figure in "Patio", voiced by Graham Norton.
- Mr Chittock, angry neighbour to Rex, after the gang went into his house and drank his beer. Voiced by veteran alternative comedian Stephen Frost.
- Johnny Saveloy, a teenage sausage who was really very old but was kept in a state of artificial youth owing to the Church of Chemicology. Voiced by Bob Monkhouse.
- Stinky Basil, a smarmy French talent-spotter. Voiced by Antoine De Caunes, known best in the UK for presenting the Channel 4 late-night adult entertainment show Eurotrash.
- Wayne The Zebra. Voiced by Bobby Ball.
- Tiddles The Destroyer. A mean fighting cat, long known to the gang, who despises Bad Bob. Voiced by Tommy Cannon.
- The Happy Rabbits, a band who may sing beautifully but are really cranky and will not let anybody stand in their way.
- Awards announcer in "Wendy's New Hair Do" and Handsome Rex in "Wendy's Hot Date", voiced by Jonathan Ross.

== References to other Aardman productions ==
Several episodes of Rex the Runt contain inside references to other projects created by Aardman Animations:

- In the episode "Adventures on Telly, Part 1", Wallace (from the Wallace and Gromit series) is washing the windows on Rex's house, until Bad Bob pushes his ladder over (in the film A Close Shave, Wallace operates a window washing business).
- Pib and Pog, two of Aardman's lesser known creations, are present in the spectator gallery during the courtroom scene from "The Trials of Wendy" and are also present in the audience watching Rex's band in "Stinky's Search for a Star".
- In the episode "Johnny Saveloy's Undoing", two of the jars containing the chemical essences of various stars are labelled "Wallace" and "Gromit". Another jar on the top shelf reads "Nick Park".
- Osvaldo Halitosis in "Patio" is actually Morph, a character from an Aardman children's show, wearing a trench coat, hat, and large moustache.
- There are two references in the episode "Wayne the Zebra": A Chicken Run-style chicken (Edwina) is rejected during the auditions (with Bad Bob making a comment regarding the recent popularity of chickens, referring to the film's success), and Bad Bob consults the Aardman book Cracking Animation (ISBN 0-500-28168-8, published in the US as Creating 3-D Animation).
- The episode entitled "A Crap Day Out" may be a pun on the Wallace and Gromit short film A Grand Day Out.
- Both Wallace from Wallace and Gromit and Rex live on streets that sound similar to their names: whereas Wallace and Gromit live on "West Wallaby Street", it can be seen from the various post that arrives for the household that Rex and company live at "7, Marsupial Way, Rexford"

Additionally, later Aardman projects have also made reference to the series.

- In the 2000 animated film Chicken Run, Nick and Fetcher can be seen eating Chuffy dog food.
- In the 2003 animated TV series Creature Comforts: in the episode Is Anyone Out There? a blue alien wears a T-shirt with Vince on it.
- In the 2006 film Flushed Away: young rat named Maximillian "Shocky" Malone wears a green T-shirt with Rex on it.
- In the 2015 film Shaun the Sheep Movie: Vince is one of the photographed animals marked as 'contained' by Trumper.
- In the 2019 film A Shaun the Sheep Movie: Farmageddon: During the end credits, the stars briefly form in the shape of Bad Bob.

== Episode list ==
All airdates are sourced from the BBC Genome.

=== Series 1 (1998–1999) ===
Series 1 was broadcast over Christmas 1998, originally airing in the prime-time family slots, most likely owing to Fox's The Simpsons also airing in the same time slot, but after several outraged letters complaining about language and content in show, the last few episodes were shown in later time slots. "'Note:"' "Episodes are ordered by their production number, not by their original air date."

# Production Number	# Broadcast Number	Title	Summary	Airdate
1	1	"Holiday in Vince"	The Runts try to cure Vince of his Random Pavarotti Disease (a Tourette syndrome-like singing of phrases of opera) by miniaturising a submarine to go on a journey through Vince's brain.	21 December 1998
2	6	"Adventures on Telly, Part 1"	After their television gets broken, the Telly Man wants them to cover for him while he is fixing the family's TV. First, they need to find money to start their adventure, which causes Bad Bob to Rob a bank.	23 December 1998
3	7	"Adventures on Telly, Part 2"	The Runts are short of money again, and lend themselves to Dr. Dogg's animal experiments. NOTE: This episode is an expanded version of the pilot "North by North Pole".	24 December 1998
4	8	"Adventures on Telly, Part 3"	After accidentally destroying the Earth, the Runts head towards a black hole.	25 December 1998
5	2	"Bob's International Hiccup Centre"	Bob loses his comic timing, so he turns to medicine.	21 December 1998
6	5	"Easter Island"	The Runts' helicopter crash lands on Easter Island, where they meet visiting aliens who resemble the local statues.	23 December 1998
7	3	"Too Many Dogs"	After Rex's house is stolen, the Runts go back in time to recover it, and meet parallel versions of themselves.	22 December 1998
8	11	"The Trials of Wendy"	Wendy is arrested after shooting Vince. After she is proven not guilty, she starts to make a name for herself, causing Rex the Runt to get cancelled by the Telly.	30 December 1998
9	4	"Stinky's Search for a Star"	The Runts enter a talent contest hoping to win enough money to pay the gas bill.	22 December 1998
10	12	"Under the Duvet"	The Runts visit the University of Love under their bed, while Vince falls in love with a vacuum cleaner.	31 December 1998
11	9	"Johnny Saveloy's Undoing"	Wendy joins Johnny Saveloy's following.	27 December 1998
12	10	"The City Shrinkers"	The Runts win Birmingham in the lottery. After shrinking it with their shrinking gun, Bad Bob and Wendy go on a city-shrinking craze.	29 December 1998
13	13	"Carbonara"	Rex is accidentally run through a sausage mincer, and must avoid the attentions of a hungry Vince.	1 January 1999

=== Series 2 (2001-2005) ===
Series 2 was aired between 23 September 2001 to 16 December 2001 on late nights. Each episode was then repeated the following Sunday on BBC Two.

#	Title	Summary	Airdate
1	"Mouse in Me Kitchen"	Upon returning home, Rex finds that his kitchen has been occupied by a mouse.	23 September 2001
2	"Wendy's Hot Date"	Wendy gets a date with a handsome dog, who is also called Rex.	30 September 2001
3	"Patio"	The garden ants object when the Runts lay down a patio.	7 October 2001
4	"A Crap Day Out"	A new garden centre is opening, and Bad Bob needs a new shed.	14 October 2001
5	"Slim Bob"	Bad Bob consults Dr. Dogg about weight loss.	21 October 2001
6	"Private Wendy"	Vince, Wendy, Rex and Bob join the army.	28 October 2001
7	"Rocket Raymond"	The inhabitants of a distant planet believe that Rex is their hero, Rocket Raymond.	4 November 2001
8	"The Plasticene Gene"	Dr. Dogg cons Rex out of his ear, and later clones Vince.	11 November 2001
9	"Wendy's New Hairdo"	Wendy gets a Nobel Peace Prize nomination for her truth drug.	18 November 2001
10	"Bob Joins a Gang"	Bad Bob joins a not-so-bad gang.	2 December 2001
11	"Wayne the Zebra"	With Rex on holiday, Bob is left in charge of a production involving "The Beast of Crannock Moore", but can his choice for the star character, Wayne the Zebra, fulfil expectations?	9 December 2001
12	"Hole in the Garden"	Bad Bob's lawn mower crashes through the garden and lands in Australia.	16 December 2001
13	"The Art of Cooking"	Bad Bob steals Rex's food creations and enters them in an art exhibition.	19 April 2005 (Note: This episode was supposed to air on BBC Two on November 25, 2001, but it did not for unknown reasons. It was later aired on BBC Four in 2005.)

== Cast ==
=== Main cast ===
- Andrew Franks as Rex (series 1)
- Colin Rote as Rex (series 2)
- Kevin Wrench as Bad Bob (series 1)
- Andy Jeffers as Bad Bob (series 2)
- Elisabeth Hadley as Wendy
- Steve Box as Vince
- Paul Merton as Doctor Dogg
- Arthur Smith as Arthur Dustcart

=== Guest stars ===
These include:

- Morwenna Banks as Mrs. Bloomers & Voice ("A Holiday in Vince") ("Adventures on Telly Part I")
- Judith Chalmers as Judith Poodle ("A Holiday in Vince", "The Trials of Wendy")
- Bob Holness as Mr. Formal ("Adventures on Telly, Part I")
- Eddie Izzard as Melting Blob Man ("Adventures on Telly, Part III"), and Easter Island Head Aliens ("Easter Island")
- Kathy Burke as Kylie Mandelbrotska ("Adventures on Telly, Part III", "Rocket Raymond", "Wendy's New Hair Do")
- Antoine de Caunes as Stinky Basil ("Too Many Dogs", "Stinky's Search for a Star", "Bob's International Hiccup Centre"), and French Delegate ("Bob's International Hiccup Centre")
- June Whitfield as Judge Pikelet ("The Trials of Wendy")
- Simon Day as Constable Funnyname ("The Trials of Wendy", "Stinky's Search for a Star", "Bob Joins a Gang")
- Pam Ayres as Aunty Brenda ("Under the Duvet", "Slim Bob")
- Stanley Unwin as Mr. Wangle, Accountant to the Stars ("Johnny Saveloy's Undoing")
- Bob Monkhouse as Johnny Saveloy ("Johnny Saveloy's Undoing", "The City Shrinkers")
- Tommy Cannon as Tiddles the Destroyer ("Mouse in Me Kitchen")
- Graham Norton as Osvaldo Halitosis ("Patio") and the Plants ("A Crap Day Out")
- Bobby Ball as Wayne ("Wayne the Zebra")
- Phill Jupitus as Morris the One-Gloved Mouse ("Mouse in Me Kitchen"), The Ants ("Patio") and Sergeant Major ("Private Wendy")
- Jonathan Ross as Handsome Rex ("Wendy's Hot Date") and Awards Announcer ("Wendy's New Hairdo")
- Loyd Grossman as himself ("The Art of Cooking")

== Production ==
As previously mentioned, Rex the Runt consisted mainly of two short films that were entirely animated by Richard Starzak during his free time. The animation from these shorts were very crude and bizarre, and featured different designs for the gang. At the time, the team at Aardman had never known about these films, and did not discover them until a year later, as they found potential to turn these shorts into a series. Each episode of the series cost $166,000.

The show was originally going to be on Saturday Zoo as comedy skits for the show, the main idea being that it was "like a cartoon strip". Soon after, the BBC got interested in the series. From here, the episodes slowly got longer, until the 10-minute episodes that it eventually used.

With help from the crew, a third pilot (North by North Pole) was produced as a pitch for the BBC in 1996, this time with much smoother animation and a plotline that would later define how the series was going to be. Parts of this pilot were incorporated into the episode "The Adventures On Telly, Part 2" owing to the footage being expensive to reshoot.

The production of Series 1 began between late 1997 and early 1998. It was produced at Wetherell Place, Aardman's smallest studio space. The production office was on-site. A storyboard artist continually sketched boards for episodes to be shot later in the schedule, and there was a model-shop attached to the studio (where the models and props would be made). The unusual animation technique was laying the characters on top of a sheet of glass with the backgrounds behind the sheet (with the backgrounds being below the sheet, to show depth) angled away from the animators at 45 degrees. At any point, two to three episodes could be in production at any time, with each episode taking around four to six weeks to make. Some scenes, such as most of "The Adventures On Telly, Part 3" were filmed in front of a blue-screen to show a different background, such as space. The animation of Series 1 took 10 months, then went into post-production, and finally aired in December 1998.

The models did not use armatures owing to of the strange form of animation, making them much easier to move around.

== Underdog ==
Underdog is an advertising character (voiced by Joe Pasquale), first appearing in 2010, animated by Aardman Animations, in the same style as the Rex the Runt figures, but wearing bandages, promoting the personal injury claims company National Accident Helpline.

Underdog also has a friend named Cindy.

== Reception ==
On IMDb, Rex the Runt received a rating of 7.9/10 from 367 users.

== Merchandise ==
Rex the Runt was eventually popular enough to have its own merchandise. Some known items of merchandise include:

- Rex the Runt's Rainy Day Companion, a book written by Kevin Wrench and Andrew Franks.
- Five Rex the Runt plushies; the characters being Rex, Wendy, Bad Bob, Vince, and even a duplicate of Vince wearing his chicken bib and holding cutlery (as he is seen in Carbonara).
- Several DVDs released in different countries (with a few episodes from Season 2 being featured on "Aardman's Darkside", a DVD containing some of Aardman's "darker" material).
- A bag in the shape of Vince.
- Limited edition Rex the Runt-themed "Starburst Juicy Gums".
- Various T-shirts with unique designs, such as the logo and/or main cast on them.
- A mostly-obscure video game named Rex the Runt: Lost Marbles, based on the first episode "Holiday in Vince", in which Rex, Wendy and Bad Bob must go inside Vince's body to collect marbles and cure his "Random Pavarotti Disease".

== Cancelled content ==
There were many things that never happened, owing to the series ending so quickly. The series' creator, Richard Starzak, hoped to be able to do the following:

- A possible Series 3.
- More backstory for the characters, including an implied history between Wendy and Bad Bob.
- Expansion of episodes into 30-minutes.
