= Raymond Allen (scriptwriter) =

British television comedy writer (1940–2022)

- Born: Raymond John Allen; 15 March 1940 Ryde, Isle of Wight, England
- Died: 2 October 2022 (aged 82) Isle of Wight, England
- Occupation: Screenwriter, playwright
- Period: 1971–1987; 2016
- Genre: Comedy
- Spouse: Nancy Williams (m. 2017)

Raymond John Allen (15 March 1940 – 2 October 2022) was a British television screenwriter and playwright. He was best known for creating the 1970s BBC sitcom Some Mothers Do 'Ave 'Em. He wrote comedy sketches for entertainers Frankie Howerd and Dave Allen, and later Max Wall, Little and Large and Hale and Pace.

== Early life ==
Allen was born in Ryde on the Isle of Wight on 15 March 1940. His father, Les Allen, worked as a railway supervisor; his mother was Ivy (Ayley). Allen attended Ryde Secondary Modern School in his hometown until he was sixteen. He started out as a cub reporter for newspaper the Isle of Wight Times, but quit after 18 months due to the unsocial hours he had to work. He went on to serve in the Royal Air Force, working at its accounts office in Gloucestershire for three years. Upon returning to the island, he took jobs washing dishes in hotels and cleaning at Shanklin's Regal Cinema.

== Career ==
Allen decided to become a playwright, and wrote around 30 serious plays; however, these were commercially unsuccessful for more than a decade.

The script for his first sitcom was rejected by ITV, but his second script, conceived under the working title Have A Break, Take A Husband, was accepted by the BBC. It revolves around a couple, Frank and Betty Spencer, taking their honeymoon at a hotel; however, BBC producer and director Michael Mills thought the story would be better reserved for later in a series (it became episode 4), with the first episode instead featuring Frank Spencer becoming a sales rep; these plans became the series Some Mothers Do 'Ave 'Em. Michael Crawford was cast in the starring role and created many of the character's traits himself. Allen was subsequently invited to write six further episodes, with two more series coming afterward.

Allen followed this up with The Dobson Doughnut (1974) but only the pilot episode was broadcast. Two other sitcom proposals – Don't Move Now (1976) and You're a Genius (1977) – were produced but were not broadcast.

Allen subsequently contributed to nine editions of The Little and Large Show and sold some one-off plays. He also wrote for All Cricket and Wellies (1986), as well as the children's show Fast Forward in 1987. However, he was unable to repeat his early success. He had more positive results on the stage with One of Our Howls Is Missing, which toured in 1979.

== Later life and death ==
In 2016, Allen contributed some of the dialogue to a special one-off episode of Some Mothers' Do 'Ave 'Em for charity Sport Relief in association with BBC Sport. He married Nancy Williams the following year. She had one son from a previous relationship. They resided in Ryde during his later years. Some Mothers Do 'Ave 'Em was adapted for the stage by Guy Unsworth, and a tour began in 2018.

Allen died on 2 October 2022, on the Isle of Wight. He was 82, and had suffered from cancer.

== Writing credits ==
Production	Notes	Broadcaster	Ref
Dave Allen at Large	"Episode #1.1" (1971)	BBC1	
Some Mothers Do 'Ave 'Em	22 episodes (1973–1975, 1978)	BBC1	
Comedy Playhouse	"The Dobson Doughnut" (1974)	BBC1	
The Little and Large Show	9 episodes (1978)	BBC1	
