= Some Mothers Do 'Ave 'Em =

British TV sitcom (1973–1978)

- Genre: Sitcom
- Created by: Raymond Allen
- Written by: Raymond Allen
- Directed by: Michael Mills (1973, plus two specials); Sydney Lotterby (1978)
- Starring: Michael Crawford; Michele Dotrice
- Theme music composer: Ronnie Hazlehurst
- Country of origin: United Kingdom
- Original language: English
- No. of series: 3 (plus 3 Christmas Specials and 1 Sport Relief Special)
- No. of episodes: 23

Production
- Producers: Michael Mills (13 episodes, 1973, plus 1 special; Sydney Lotterby (7 episodes, 1978)
- Running time: Regular episodes: Series 1–2: 30 minutes Series 3: 35 minutes Christmas specials: 45–50 minutes
- Production company: BBC

Original release
- Network: BBC1
- Release: 15 February 1973 – 25 December 1978
- Release: 18 March 2016

Some Mothers Do 'Ave 'Em is a British sitcom broadcast on BBC1, created and written by Raymond Allen and starring Michael Crawford and Michele Dotrice. It was first broadcast in 1973 and ran for two series, including two Christmas specials in 1974 and 1975. After a three-year absence, the programme returned for a third series in 1978 and again in 2016 for a one-off special. The series regularly garnered 25 million viewers and was broadcast in 60 countries.

The series follows the maladroit Frank Spencer through his various attempts to get and keep a job, which frequently end in disaster. The sitcom was noted for its stunt work, performed by Crawford himself, and it featured several well-known and much-lampooned catchphrases that have become part of British popular culture. In the 2004 series Britain's Best Sitcom, Some Mothers Do 'Ave 'Em placed 22nd in the list of all British sitcoms.

== Title ==
The series was originally conceived under the working title Have a Break, Take a Husband.

The expression "some mothers do have them" was once a common British saying to refer to a foolish or inept person.

== Character of Frank Spencer ==
The ambitious but accident-prone Frank Spencer, who often wears his trademark beret and mackintosh, is married to the long-suffering Betty (Michele Dotrice), and in later series they have a baby daughter, Jessica.

The character was popular with impressionists such as Mike Yarwood in the 1970s, particularly Frank's ostensible main catchphrase, "Ooh Betty", which may actually have been said in only one episode (Series 2, Episode 2).

Other catchphrases include a quavering "Oooh ...", usually uttered with Frank's forefinger to his mouth as he stands amidst the chaos of some disaster he has just caused. He also sometimes complains about being "ha-RASSed!", or, occasionally, "I've had a lot of ha-RASSments lately" (originally an American pronunciation). Other recurring catchphrases include references to "a bit of trouble" and to the cat having "done a whoopsie" (presumably a euphemism for having defecated in an inappropriate place, on one occasion in Spencer's beret). When Frank is pleased or confused, he will often use the catchphrases "Mmmm – nice!" or "Ohhh – nice!".

Frank is essentially a sympathetic character who is loved by Betty despite his faults. He venerates the memory of his late mother and treasures his daughter. References to Frank's mother suggest she was very much like her son. Frank claimed he last saw his father at Paddington Station when only 18 months old. Crawford has mentioned that he based many of Frank's reactions on those of a young child.

The final series was produced after a break of five years (not counting two Christmas specials). Though still written by Raymond Allen, it was based on stories by Crawford. Frank's character changes noticeably in this series, becoming more self-aware and keen to make himself appear educated and well-spoken. He develops an air of pomposity, best demonstrated when someone enquires for "Mr. Spencer?", to which he habitually replies, "I am he." He also becomes more self-assured and more willing to defend himself when criticised, sometimes winning arguments by leaving his opponents dumbfounded by the bizarre nature of his statements. Frank also commits numerous malapropisms, especially when using long words to sound clever. For example, in the final episode he says 'pissdomestic' instead of 'pessimistic'.

Michael Crawford and Michele Dotrice, as Frank and Betty Spencer

Acknowledging the show's success in Australia, in the final series Frank mentions relations who live there and contemplates emigrating himself.

== Legacy ==
Crawford later had difficulty disassociating himself from the role, despite his career as a successful musical performer on the West End and Broadway stage and in popular musicals such as Barnum and The Phantom of the Opera.

== Cast ==
Ronnie Barker and Norman Wisdom were the BBC's first and second choices for the role of Frank. David Jason was also a contender, but he was rejected because BBC executives at the time believed that he lacked star quality. However, the casting of Crawford proved effective because he invented many of Frank's mannerisms and catchphrases (some of which he had employed in the 1969 film Hello, Dolly!), and because of his ability to perform stunts and physical comedy.

- Michael Crawford as Frank Spencer
- Michele Dotrice as Betty Spencer (née Fisher)

Supporting cast

- Jessica Forte as Jessica Spencer, Frank and Betty's daughter (5 episodes; series 3)
- Jane Hylton as Mrs. Fisher, Betty's mother (3 episodes; series 1)
- Anthony Woodruff as Dr. Smedley, one of several doctors who attend to the Spencers (3 episodes; series 1 and 2)
- Dick Bentley as Grandad Spencer, Frank's errant grandfather who visits from Australia (3 episodes; series 3)
- Glynn Edwards (3 episodes) and Jean Boht (2 episodes) as Mr. and Mrs. Lewis, the Spencers' neighbours after they move house (series 3)
- Cyril Luckham as Father O'Hara, a local priest (2 episodes; series 2)

=== Guest cameos ===
Most episodes would introduce at least one other character (such as a doctor, neighbour or employer) who would usually become unnerved by Frank's peculiar manner and clumsiness.

Guest cameo roles were played by actors including George Baker, James Cossins, Peter Jeffrey, Richard Wilson, Fulton Mackay, Bernard Hepton, Christopher Timothy, George Sewell, Bryan Pringle, Christopher Biggins, Milton Johns, Diane Holland, John Ringham, David Ryall, Gretchen Franklin, Geoffrey Chater, Royston Tickner, Michael Redfern, Babar Bhatti, Norman Chappell, Geoffrey Whitehead, Desmond Llewelyn and Elisabeth Sladen (who, in her autobiography, mentions that she was considered for the role of Betty).

== Theme tune ==
The theme song by Ronnie Hazlehurst features two piccolos spelling out the title in Morse code, excluding the apostrophes.

▄ ▄ ▄	▄▄▄ ▄▄▄ ▄▄▄	▄▄▄ ▄▄▄	▄	▄▄▄ ▄▄▄	▄▄▄ ▄▄▄ ▄▄▄	▄▄▄	▄ ▄ ▄ ▄	▄	▄ ▄▄▄ ▄	▄ ▄ ▄	▄▄▄ ▄ ▄	▄▄▄ ▄▄▄ ▄▄▄	▄ ▄▄▄	▄ ▄ ▄ ▄▄▄	▄	▄	▄▄▄ ▄▄▄	▄ ▄▄▄ ▄ ▄▄▄ ▄ ▄▄▄
S	o	m	e	M	o	t	h	e	r	s	D	o	A	v	e	E	m	(full stop)

== Series overview ==
=== Regular episodes ===
Series	Episodes	Originally released	
Series	Episodes	First released	Last released
1	7	15 February 1973	29 March 1973
2	6	22 November 1973	27 December 1973
3	6	11 November 1978	16 December 1978

=== Christmas special episodes ===
Series	Episodes	Originally released
Special	1	25 December 1974
Special	1	25 December 1975
Special	1	25 December 1978

=== 2016 Sport Relief sketch ===
Series	Episodes	Originally released
Special	1	18 March 2016

== Episodes ==
=== Series 1 (Early 1973) ===
Title	Episode Number	Airdate	Description	Notes
"Getting a Job" (aka "The Job Interview")	1	15 February 1973	Newly married Frank and Betty are due to move into their new flat, but are currently living with Betty's mother, Mrs Fisher. Betty has bought Frank a new briefcase for his impending job interview at Lewis & Co.'s ironmongers for the position of area sales manager. With Betty's advice of remembering to smile, Frank turns up at his interview later than expected, after getting stuck in a lift. When he finally meets the general manager, Mr Lewis, he causes him a lot of frustration. By the end of the interview, Mr Lewis is on the verge of a breakdown.	The initial shot of the postman delivering the present that Betty has got for Frank's interview is of 2 Hemlock Road, White City, W12. Herne Bay in Kent features in this episode where Frank (Michael Crawford) arrives at a shop for a job interview.
"George's House"	2	22 February 1973	Frank and Betty are invited to stay the weekend at Betty's brother George's modern electronically designed home. George receives a visit from Mr Fletcher, an American house builder, who may well offer George's employer an order worth thousands of pounds if he likes the equipment, but after Frank loses his slippers down the toilet and ruins it, trouble begins to brew. The situation worsens when the cistern starts to leak and the water ends up interfering with the house's electrical systems, causing George's electronic gadgets to become uncontrollable and Betty and Frank to damage the electric control system, which then sets the house on fire.	Stars Peter Greene, Michael Golden.
"Love Thy Neighbour"	3	1 March 1973	Betty's mother turns up at the Spencer household unexpectedly, suitcase in hand, after leaving her husband and collapses on their couch. Betty feels that Dr Smedley should be contacted, and Frank is the one left to do it, but with the phone box out of action, he pays a visit to his new neighbour, Mr Faraday. Frank calls Dr Smedley but gives him Mr Faraday's address rather his own, and causes a misunderstanding. After all the confusion, Frank locks himself out of the house, and once again has to trouble Mr Faraday, this time for the use of his ladder.	First appearance of Dr. H. S. Smedley, the family doctor (portrayed here by Anthony Woodruff).
"Have a Break, Take a Husband" (aka "Hotel")	4	8 March 1973	As a second honeymoon, Frank and Betty decide to take a trip to a very old fashioned hotel owned by Mr Bedford. Things get off to a bad start when Frank very nearly misses the train and has to run after it down the platform. After arriving at their hotel, Frank takes it upon himself to make a few adjustments to the broken room, which eventually result in their lino getting torn, a broken wardrobe and a hole in their floor. Meanwhile, across the landing, another guest, Kenny, is having difficulty getting to sleep between the noises coming from the Spencers' destroyed room and his furniture disappearing. Property that was allegedly damaged included two holes in the floor/ceiling, a lino, a painting, drawers and a wardrobe. After the episode, the hotel closed down the room for ten days for a renovation.	Scenes were filmed in Herne Bay in Kent, including the railway station and Carlton Hotel. Interior scenes with the hotel room is filmed in the studios, guest-stars Cyril Shaps and Neil McCarthy.
"The Hospital Visit"	5	15 March 1973	Frank's been fending for himself with Betty in hospital, and has just had a spot of bother with a steak and kidney pudding (which explodes). Now he's off to visit her, but is the recovery ward ready for him?	Guest-stars Elisabeth Sladen.
"The Psychiatrist"	6	22 March 1973	After being relieved of his job as a member of a fire crew, Frank feels that he is a failure. Betty thinks that he should go and see someone who would understand his situation. He goes to see Mr Webster, a psychiatrist who tries his best to get to the root of Frank's problem.	Guest-stars Bernard Hepton.
"The Employment Exchange"	7	29 March 1973	Having lost his latest job as a window cleaner, Frank ends up back at the employment exchange, where new manager Mr Bradshaw insists that he can be employed. Bradshaw takes Frank on as an employee around the building, but soon begins to regret it.	Guest-stars George A. Cooper, Edward Hardwicke.

=== Series 2 (Late 1973) ===
Title	Episode Number	Airdate	Description	Notes
"Cliffhanger"	8	22 November 1973	Frank's latest job includes a company car which he and Betty use to go on a picnic. Things start out well enough until Frank manages to reverse the car halfway over the edge of the cliff.	
"The RAF Reunion"	9	29 November 1973	Frank Spencer is excited about attending his Royal Air Force reunion. He relives his short but eventful time in the RAF through flashbacks, including his air-crew medical, an unforgettable aptitude test, and his time as a cook. His enthusiasm for the reunion leads to a series of mishaps, including sleepwalking and causing chaos at the reunion itself.	This episode contains flashbacks of Frank's past. Guest-stars Fulton Mackay, Desmond Llewelyn
"The Public Relations Course"	10	6 December 1973	Having lost yet another job Betty suggests Frank try out a course in public relations training. Frank heads off to the school run by Mr Watson, a very experienced public relations expert, who is confident he can make Frank a success but Frank proves too much even for him.	Guest-stars James Cossins.
"Frank and Marvin"	11	13 December 1973	Frank discovers he is going to be a father and determines to make a success of his new job at a holiday camp as an entertainer. His act includes a very poor ventriloquist act, bad jokes about kangaroos, an interesting rendition of "Early One Morning" and a human volcano act, which he manages to set off by accident.	Guest-stars Christopher Timothy.
"Father's Clinic"	12	20 December 1973	In preparation for parenthood, Betty has been looking after two young children from the neighbourhood and she convinces Frank to come along on one of their outings. The girls seem wary of Frank at first, but his accident-prone ways which they find hilarious soon win them over.	This episode involves an elaborate stunt when Frank, who is roller skating at a rink, manages to burst through the fire exit and on a hellish journey through the streets, dodging buses and cars, ducking under lorries and crashing into a baby shop.
"The Baby Arrives"	13	27 December 1973	Frank is worrying about his impending fatherhood and is starting to annoy the hospital staff with his constant false alarms. The doctors tell the Spencers that they have another week to go but that night baby Spencer has other ideas. With their doctor on holiday another one is drafted in, the same one whose car Frank reversed into earlier that day.	Birth and first appearance of Jessica, Frank's daughter. Guest appearance of Diane Holland as the maternity ward receptionist.

=== 1974 and 1975 Christmas specials ===
Title	Episode Number	Airdate	Description	Notes
"Jessica's First Christmas"	14	25 December 1974	Frank gets involved in the church's nativity play (in the role of an angel), much against Father O'Hara's wishes – and with predictably disastrous results.	Guest-starring Cyril Luckham and Bryan Pringle. This episode probably shows one of the series's riskiest stunts where after crashing upwards through the church's roof, Frank has to be rescued by helicopter.
"Learning to Drive"	15	25 December 1975	After being sacked from his job as a Christmas pixie, Frank receives a letter from the BBC inviting him to appear on a show called Man about the Home. David Jacobs turns up and attempts to film but Frank's DIY disasters become apparent. At the same time, Frank is taking driving lessons. He takes his test (for the 10th time) — a series of near misses ensue and Frank ends up driving off the end of a pier into the sea. Even then, he yells to the harassed and bedraggled examiner, who has made rapidly for the shore, "Mr Hayes – have I passed?"	Extensive filming on the Isle of Sheppey, Kent, including the Kingsferry Bridge and Sheerness jetty. Guest-stars Campbell Singer, George Sewell and Peter Jeffrey.

=== Series 3 (1978) ===
Title	Episode Number	Airdate	Description	Notes
"Moving House"	16	11 November 1978	The Spencers' move gets off to a bad start when Frank manages to fall out of the moving van into a barrel of tar and take half the furniture with him. Things get worse when within hours of arriving he not only gets on the wrong side of Mr Lewis from next door but half destroys his bedroom ceiling.	In this episode, Frank sings a lullaby to his daughter, Jessica. First appearance of Frank's new, bad tempered neighbour, Mr Lewis (Glynn Edwards), and his wife (Jean Boht). Also includes an appearance by Milton Johns as housing officer Mr Denham.
"Wendy House"	17	18 November 1978	Frank is being kept very busy at woodwork classes especially when the insurance company value his entire collection of furniture at £40. To speed things along he has started using super glue which unfortunately manages to stick him, an old lady and a bus conductor to a chair. In addition to new furniture, Frank is building a Wendy House for Jessica, a very large Wendy House that proves too big to get through the workshop door.	Features Richard Wilson as the insurance man. First appearance of Columbo, Frank's dog. Scenes of the dog following Frank home were filmed in Chestnut Avenue, Queens Park, Bedford.
"Scottish Dancing"	18	25 November 1978	Frank and Betty have taken up Scottish country dancing and Frank has decided to go into politics and with a gala dinner for a Liberal Party candidate approaching, the rest of the committee are determined not to let Frank cause an embarrassment.	
"Men as Women"	19	2 December 1978	Frank receives a letter from Grandpa Spencer in Australia inviting him and Betty to join him and help run his farm. Meanwhile, Dr Mender (Derek Farr) appears to be very depressed and preoccupied and for once Frank is not responsible.	First appearance of Grandpa Spencer.
"King of the Road" (aka "Demon King")	20	9 December 1978	Frank's new job as a motorbike courier lands him in trouble with the law and up before the magistrates. Frank defends himself in the only way he knows how.	
"Australia House"	21	16 December 1978	Frank is taking elocution lessons in preparation for his flying lessons. Meanwhile, a letter arrives from Australia House asking the Spencers to come discuss their possible emigration to Australia. By the end of the interview Mr Lawrence tells Frank he can go just to get rid of him.	Starring Edward Hardwicke

=== 1978 Christmas special ===
Title	Episode Number	Airdate	Description	Notes
"Learning to Fly"	22	25 December 1978	Frank begins his flying lessons at the local school but things take a bit of a bad turn when Frank manages to cause his instructor to pass out in mid flight. Starring Christopher Biggins as a learner pilot.	Final episode. Due to time pressures and aircraft noise problems, sound recordists were unable to accurately capture the audio within the aircraft cockpit. To alleviate this, the BBC Radiophonic Workshop used stock library sounds, including wind noise, the Wilhelm Scream No3 and radio chatter from a previous episode of Dad's Army. The engine sound was recreated using an edited version of the aircraft sounds used in the film The Dam Busters. Post-synching issues mean it is clearly evident in these scenes that the actors' voices have had to be re-recorded.

=== 2016 Sport Relief sketch ===
Title	Episode Number	Airdate	Description	Notes
"Frank Relief"	23	18 March 2016	Frank is on a journey by bicycle and roller skates to see his daughter Jessica take part in a race at the Olympic Velodrome.	Sketch for Sport Relief. Gemma Arterton guest-stars as a grown up version of Baby Jessica, alongside Paul McCartney, Jenson Button, Boris Johnson, Roy Hodgson, Arsène Wenger, David Walliams, Jessica Ennis-Hill, Bradley Wiggins, Dave Brailsford, Clare Balding, Chris Hoy, Andy Murray, and Jamie Murray playing themselves, & Christopher Wilson as the newsagent.

== Repeats ==
Frank Spencer sporting his trademark beret with broadcaster David Jacobs

The BBC has repeated Some Mothers Do 'Ave 'Em several times since the series was produced in the 1970s. British channels Gold, BBC Two and BBC Prime took over repeats of the programme in 2007. Drama showed the series in early 2023. The programmes were aired on BBC Four and archived for streaming on BBC iPlayer. In June 2024 it was repeated on That's TV.

The programme has been shown on Catalan public television TV3 (Catalonia), the Gibraltar Broadcasting Corporation in the 1970s, in Nigeria on NTA since the 1980s, in Australia on the Nine Network's GO! from 2009 to 2010 and later on the Seven Network's digital channel 7TWO. It was also screened in the 1980s by TVNZ in New Zealand, where it was popular.

== Special ==
On 18 March 2016, Michael Crawford and Michele Dotrice reprised their roles for a one-off sketch for Sport Relief. Gemma Arterton guest-stars as Jessica, alongside Jenson Button, Boris Johnson, Sir Paul McCartney, Roy Hodgson, Arsène Wenger, David Walliams, Jessica Ennis, Sir Bradley Wiggins, Clare Balding, Sir Chris Hoy, Sir Andy Murray and Jamie Murray playing themselves.

== Documentaries ==
A behind-the-scenes documentary entitled To Be Perfectly Frank was first broadcast on BBC 1 on Easter Monday, 11 April 1977.

Some Mothers Do 'Ave 'Em: Secrets & Scandals is a 45-minute (60 minutes with ad breaks) behind-the-scenes documentary made by Raw Cut Productions Ltd for Channel 5, first broadcast on 5 August 2022. It features Graham McCann, comedy historian, Mat Irvine, visual effects designer, and Raymond Allen, creator and writer, revealing how the show was inspired and created and how the stunts were made.

== Home video ==
In the United Kingdom, six episodes from Series 1 and various other episodes were originally released by BBC Video on VHS in the 1990s. Series 1 and Series 2 were released on VHS and DVD on 21 October 2002. Series 3 and the Christmas specials were released on VHS and DVD on 19 May 2003. The Complete Series was released on VHS and DVD on 6 October 2003 by Second Sight available. On 1 November 2010, 2 entertain reissued Some Mothers Do 'Ave 'Em – The Complete Christmas Specials. On 14 February 2011, Some Mothers Do 'Ave 'Em – The Complete Series and Christmas Specials was reissued by 2 entertain with new packaging.

The complete collection is available from the iTunes Store as a digital download, and was available on the BBC Store.

In Australia, Series 1–3 and the Christmas specials were released in 2003 and 2004. The complete boxed set was released in 2004 on DVD in region 4.

In the United States, 13 selected episodes were released on VHS in 1998 and reissued on Region 1 DVD in 2001. The complete series, including the 2016 Sport Relief special, was released on Region 1 DVD by the BBC and VEI in spring of 2021.

== In popular culture ==
- In The Now Show, Prince Edward is usually portrayed as Frank Spencer by Hugh Dennis. In an episode from June 2010, a sketch featured Fabio Capello using Frank Spencer impressions as a motivational strategy for the England World Cup squad.
- The programme, and the character of Frank Spencer specifically, have even been mentioned several times in the UK House of Commons. On one notable occasion, Labour Party leader John Smith taunted Conservative prime minister John Major in a speech in 1993 by saying that recent government mishaps would be considered "too much" if submitted to the show's producers by scriptwriters.
- On 14 November 1998 during an edition of Noel's House Party, Michael Crawford appeared as Frank to celebrate 25 years of the show.
- Arctic Monkeys mention Frank Spencer in their song "You Probably Couldn't See for the Lights but You Were Staring Straight at Me" from their 2006 album, Whatever People Say I Am, That's What I'm Not with the lines: "I'm so tense, never tenser/Could all go a bit Frank Spencer."
- Reuben named a song after the show – "Some Mothers Do 'Ave 'Em" is the second track on their second album Very Fast Very Dangerous.
- The title of the series, "Some Mothers Do 'Ave 'Em", is similar to Jimmy Clitheroe's catchphrase from the late-1950s to early-1970s: "Don't Some Mothers 'Ave 'Em?"
- Many of Frank Spencer's antics and catchphrases have been lampooned by numerous comedians, including Mike Yarwood and Lenny Henry.
- In the One Foot in the Grave episode "The Trial", when Victor Meldrew calls a garden centre to complain about a yucca plant that was delivered to his house being placed inside the toilet bowl with compost (after Meldrew requested that it be put in the downstairs toilet), he says that he does not know who delivered the plant but adds that it "may have been Frank Spencer". Actor Richard Wilson who played Meldrew appeared in the 1978 episode "Wendy House" of Some Mothers Do 'Ave 'Em as Mr Harris.

== Stage adaptation ==
A stage adaptation, written and directed by Guy Unsworth based on the television series, began a UK tour at the Wyvern Theatre, Swindon in February 2018. It starred Joe Pasquale as Frank Spencer, with Sarah Earnshaw as Betty and Susie Blake as Mrs. Fisher.

Following the success of the 2018 tour, the production began another tour in February 2020, but because of the COVID-19 pandemic, many dates were postponed to 2022.

== See also ==
British sitcom
