= Underdog (advertising character) =

National Accident Helpline mascot

- Underdog, the clay animation figure featured in the adverts
- Agency: The Gate, London
- Client: National Accident Helpline
- Product: Personal Injury
- Release date: 2010–2016

Underdog is a character developed by The Gate London advertising agency and animated by Aardman Animations. The character is featured in advertisements for the personal injury claims company, National Accident Helpline, a UK-based provider of personal injury services.

== Origins ==
Underdog was created in 2010 for the insurance provider National Accident Helpline, as a claymation figure (often seen with bandages on his arms, legs and ears). The character made his first TV appearance in the same year. The initial concept of Underdog was created by The Gate London advertising agency, where Dave Trott is chairman. The design of Underdog bears a close resemblance to that of the principal characters from Aardman's earlier TV series Rex the Runt created by animator Richard Starzak.

== History ==
Underdog first appeared in ads standing in the shadow of a tall figure voiced by Brian Blessed, using his catchphrase "I've had an accident!" as a way of persuading the tall man to give him compensation for an unspecified injury. When the tall man refuses to do so, Underdog tells him that he will go to National Accident Helpline instead to get proper compensation for his injury. The ads end with the tall man trying to convince Underdog to come to him for compensation instead, and Underdog hurling an insult at him intended to reduce him to less than his tall stature and deep voice convey. Background music of the Underdog advertising campaigns have included such hits as Chumbawamba's “Tubthumping” and Marvin Gaye's "I Heard It Through the Grapevine" (where the chorus lyrics have been changed to include the brand name). Underdog is voiced by British comic actor Joe Pasquale. The most recent run of ads (beginning in September 2013) featured computer-generated imagery created by Aardman Animations.

As of May 2025, Underdog has been redesigned on the Underdog.co.uk website, sparking a possible return in the future.

== Commercial success and popularity ==
Following the first Underdog campaign, the number of enquiries increased by 25% within the first month. The immediate effects of the campaign also saw cost per enquiry down by 8% and the number of brand searches for 'national accident helpline' triple.

The Underdog character has his own Pinterest board featuring images sent to National Accident Helpline by fans, ranging from Underdog shaped cakes to Underdog crochet figures.

=== TV Adverts ===
- First Ads – 21 September 2010 - 1 May 2012
- Knocked Down – 13 August 2012
- Knocked Down (Inline) — 16 October 2012
- Grapevine – 28 January 2013
- Short Ads — 29 April 2013
- 2013 Advert — 15 July 2013
- Revolving Door – 7 September 2013
- Bad Dream – 9 September 2013
- No Win, No Fee, No Risk Guarantee — 25 October 2013
- Books – 3 January 2014
- Red Tape – 31 March 2014
- Connect, Click and Claim – 2 June 2014
- Medical Negligence — 8 October 2014
- Justice Express 1 — 2 March 2015
- Justice Express 2 — 2 March 2015
- Make NAH Your Port of Call — 2 March 2015
- Loudhailer — 1 June 2015
- Aquarium — 1 June 2015
