= Some Mothers Do 'Ave 'Em (play) =

2018 play based on the TV sitcom

- Written by: Guy Unsworth
- Based on: Some Mothers Do 'Ave 'Em; TV series by Raymond Allen
- Characters: Frank Spencer; Betty Spencer; Father O'Hara; Barbara Fisher; Mr Worthington; Mr Luscombe; Leslie Robin; Constable
- Original language: English
- Genre: Comedy, Disaster

Premiere
- Date premiered: 18 February 2018
- Place premiered: Wyvern Theatre, Swindon

Some Mothers Do 'Ave 'Em is a play by Guy Unsworth based on the BBC TV sitcom of the same name by Raymond Allen.

== Background ==
The idea for a stage production of Some Mothers Do 'Ave 'Em began while Joe Pasquale was appearing in Spamalot at the Playhouse Theatre in London's West End in June 2013 (with Guy Unsworth as associate director) in which an incident with a faulty electric fan collapsing prompted the idea for Pasquale to play Frank Spencer (originally played in the TV series by Michael Crawford). When approached to create the stage version, Raymond Allen (the original TV series writer) gave his blessing for the adaptation as well as the casting of Pasquale (already being a fan of his stand-up shows).

== Production history ==
The play premiered at the Wyvern Theatre in Swindon on 21 February 2018 before embarking on a UK tour. The production was written and directed by Guy Unsworth, designed by Simon Higlett, scenery built by Splinter Scenery and starred Joe Pasquale as Frank Spencer, Sarah Earnshaw as Betty Spencer and Susie Blake as Mrs Fisher. The playtext was published on 19 July 2018 by Samuel French, Inc.

Due to the success of the 2018 tour, the production began another tour with Pasquale, Earnshaw and Blake reprising their roles, however was forced to stop due to the COVID-19 pandemic. The tour recommenced in March 2022, with James Paterson joining as Father O'Hara.

A new production opened at the Barn Theatre in Cirencester directed by Joseph O'Malley which ran from 8 July to 17 August 2024.

== Cast and characters ==
Character	UK tour			Cirencester
Character	2018	2020*	2022	2024
Frank Spencer	Joe Pasquale	Joe Pasquale	Joe Pasquale	Sam Denia
Betty Spencer	Sarah Earnshaw	Sarah Earnshaw	Sarah Earnshaw	Laura Mead
Mrs Fisher	Susie Blake	Susie Blake	Susie Blake	Julia Teal
Mr Worthing/Mr Luscombe	Moray Treadwell	Moray Treadwell	Moray Treadwell	Steven Wren
Father O'Hara	David Shaw-Parker	David Shaw-Parker	James Paterson	Derek Elroy
Constable James Desmond	Chris Kiely	Ben Watson	Ben Watson	Georgia Leila Stroller

*2020 tour cut short due to COVID-19 pandemic, which continued as the 2022 tour.

== Reception ==
The play received critical acclaim earning four and five stars across many reviews.
