= Syd Little =

English comedian (born 1942)

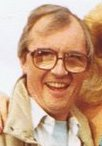
- Born: Cyril John Mead; 19 December 1942 (age 83); Blackpool, Lancashire, England
- Occupation: Television comedian
- Years active: 1971–present
- Spouse: Sheree Little (m. 1975)
- Children: 2

Syd Little (born Cyril John Mead; 19 December 1942) is an English comedian who was the straight man in the double act Little and Large, with Eddie Large.

== Life and career ==
Born in Blackpool, Little was raised in Manchester. After leaving Yew Tree Secondary Modern School, Wythenshawe, and working as an interior decorator, Little began his performing career as a singer and guitarist in Manchester pubs before teaming up with Large. Originally titled Cyril Mead and Friend, then Mead and McGinnis, after changing their name to Little and Large their double act won Opportunity Knocks in 1971 leading to a successful 20-year television career. The partnership's first television pilot was recorded in 1976, followed by a regular series in 1977. After switching to the BBC, their show was cancelled in 1991.

After the cancellation of The Little and Large Show, Little appeared occasionally on shows such as Shooting Stars, until 2005 when he took part in the reality television show Trust Me I'm A Holiday Rep. He also appeared in The Bob Monkhouse Show, Wogan and Comedy Map of Britain.

In 2015, Little took part in BBC One's Celebrity MasterChef and made it through to the third round.

In 2018, he appeared in the fly-on-the-wall documentary The Real Marigold Hotel.

In April 2020 Eddie Large died. Shortly afterwards, Syd's agent Alan Hamilton of Hamilton Management issued a statement in which Syd stated ‘I am devastated to have lost not just my comedy partner of 60 years, but my friend of 60 years’.

In 2022, Little appeared on Sky UK's Celebrity Auction House (S2, E5) and raised over £1,000 for his "new pet project". He auctioned several personal items, including his electric guitar, which he signed.

Little lives with his wife and son in Fleetwood, where they run the Steamer Pub and Little Restaurant.

== Bibliography ==
- Little, S. and Gidney, C. 2004. Little by Little. Canterbury Press, Norwich. pp. 256
- Little, S. 1999. Little Goes a Long Way: My Own Story. Harper Collins. pp. 176
