= Orchard Theatre, Dartford =

1025-seat receiving theatre in Dartford, Kent, England

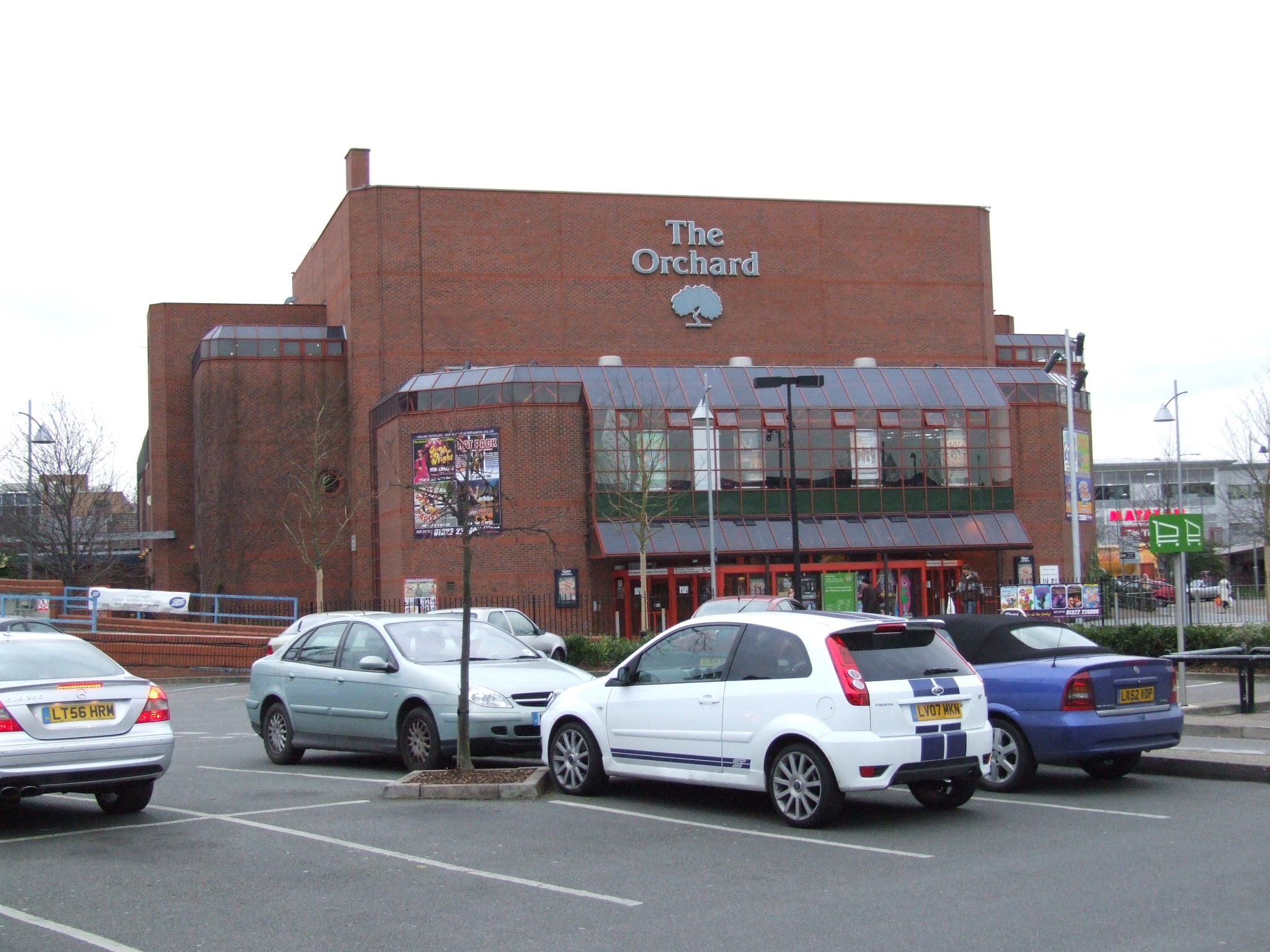
- Orchard Theatre, Dartford
- Interactive map of Orchard Theatre, Dartford
- Address: Home Gardens, Dartford, DA1 1ED
- Coordinates: 51.4459578°N 0.2177834°E
- Seating type: Reserved seating

Website
- orchardtheatre.co.uk

The Orchard Theatre is a 1025-seat receiving theatre in the centre of Dartford, Kent. It was built by Dartford Borough Council and opened by The Duke of Kent on Thursday 14 April 1983. The theatre hosts a range of popular music, comedy, family, dance, drama, classical music and variety events, as well as an annual pantomime.

It has been run by Trafalgar Entertainment since March 2021, having been acquired from HQ Theatres which had run it since 2008.

In September 2023, the theatre was temporarily closed by Dartford Council due to safety concerns over the reinforced autoclaved aerated concrete (RAAC) used in the theatre's construction. Its programme of events have moved to a temporary venue called Orchard West.
