= The Little and Large Show =

- Genre: Sketch comedy
- Starring: Syd Little; Eddie Large
- Country of origin: United Kingdom
- Original language: English
- No. of series: 11
- No. of episodes: 76

Production
- Running time: 30-50 minutes

Original release
- Network: BBC1
- Release: 1 May 1978 – 20 April 1991

The Little and Large Show is a sketch comedy series broadcast on BBC1 between 1 May 1978 and 20 April 1991, starring comedians Little and Large. Its first series was titled just Little and Large.

== Transmissions ==
=== Series ===
Series	Start date	End date	Episodes
Pilot	1 May 1978		1
1	30 September 1978	4 November 1978	6
2	23 February 1980	29 March 1980	6
3	21 February 1981	28 March 1981	6
4	17 December 1983	21 January 1984	6
5	5 January 1985	9 February 1985	6
6	1 March 1986	5 April 1986	6
7	21 February 1987	28 March 1987	6
8	6 February 1988	12 March 1988	6
9	11 February 1989	1 April 1989	8
10	3 February 1990	10 March 1990	6
11	16 March 1991	20 April 1991	6

=== Specials ===
Date	Entitle
23 December 1978	The Little and Large Christmas Show
7 May 1979	The Little and Large Show Special
1 January 1980	The Little and Large Show Special
5 May 1980	The Little and Large Show Holiday Special
20 December 1980	The Little and Large Show Special
24 December 1981	The Little and Large Show Special
30 May 1983	The Little and Large Show Special
