= National Accident Helpline =

Personal injury company in the UK

- Type: UK public company
- Industry: Personal injury
- Founded: Kettering, Northamptonshire, England (1993)
- Founder: Alan Kennedy, Paul Follett
- Headquarters: Kettering, Northamptonshire, England
- Area served: United Kingdom
- Services: No win no fee personal injury claims
- Website: www.national-accident-helpline.co.uk

National Accident Helpline is a UK-based personal injury company providing personal injury claims advice, service and support to consumers who have suffered a no-fault accident.

National Accident Helpline is part of the NAHL Group PLC and is run on a for-profit basis.

NAHL and its panel of solicitors process compensation claims on a no win no fee agreement, removing the financial risk from making a claim. Any solicitor fees are then taken from a claimant's compensation if they win.

== History ==
The National Accident Helpline was formed in 1993 by two businessmen, Alan Kennedy and Paul Follett, along with the Northampton legal firm Tollers. In 2006, Lloyds TSB Development Capital (LDC), the private equity arm of the Lloyds TSB Group, backed a management buyout enabling Kennedy to buy out Tollers and other shareholders. LDC later sold part of its stake to Inflexion Private Equity.

In April 2008, National Accident Helpline released a mobile phone SMS callback service.

The following month, the personal injury claims management company announced a new version of the company website, featuring an interactive no-win-no-fee compensation calculator.

In February 2009 National Accident Helpline was listed in the Sunday Times Deloitte Buyout Track 100 for the first time. In 2012 the company was listed in 70th place, with year-on-year growth from November 2010 to December 2011 stated as 32%.

== Specialist claims websites ==
National Accident Helpline also owns no-win-no-fee.co.uk and Benchmark Insurance. In 2010 it started advertising through underdog.co.uk.

In April 2010, National Accident Helpline published three new specialist claims websites: industrial-accident.co.uk, work-accident.co.uk and clinical-medical-negligence.co.uk.

In October 2011, the company announced mobile-friendly versions of its two core websites, National Accident Helpline and underdog.co.uk.

== Marketing ==
National Accident Helpline initially found its clients by advertising in the press. It was then one of the first claims companies to use television advertising, and this became its main source of business in the 2000s.

The company's television adverts have been one of its most visible sources of marketing. The adverts feature a character called Underdog, who is voiced by UK actor Joe Pasquale. More recent adverts have included musical backing tracks, including Chumbawamba's 1997 hit "Tubthumping" and a version of Marvin Gaye's "I Heard It Through the Grapevine" where the chorus lyrics had been changed to include the brand name.

=== Stance against cold calling ===
National Accident Helpline displays a clear policy against cold calling, cold texting and nuisance marketing on its website.

National Accident Helpline has never cold called and in December 2014 the personal injury advice service confirmed it would no longer be contacting prospective customers by email.

The firm states that any incident of cold-calling under its name has no connection with the real National Accident Helpline. It also asks victims of cold calling to report any incidents where the victim has been contacted by imposters posing as National Accident Helpline.

==== Ethical Marketing Charter ====
In July 2015, National Accident Helpline founded the Ethical Marketing Charter alongside seven other personal injury firms. By November 2016, the total number of signatories stood at over 50 firms.

The Ethical Marketing Charter encourages companies in the personal injury sector to stand against cold calling and spam marketing by signing up to a series of commitments against nuisance marketing practices.

National Accident Helpline also recently published findings on the impact of cold calling on the UK economy.

== Adverts ==
=== Spokeswoman (1997–2002) ===
National Accident Helpline was the first personal injury company to advertise in the press in 1994 and on television in 1997. The first set used from 1997 to 1999 featured the spokeswoman (Teresa Quigley) telling people that if they had an accident which wasn't their fault, they could be entitled to compensation. As she continues, two people are shown with their name tag and how much they earned in compensation.

In 1999, people took on a more active role, still featuring the same spokeswoman at the start and end, as they shared their story of accidents and what the company did to earn them their compensation.

=== New spokeswoman (2002–2009) ===
From 2002 up to 2009, the most familiar set of adverts aired. They featured actors recreating scenes where they have an accident and said how much money they earned in compensation and how they earned it with no problems at all. The advert then ends once again with the spokeswoman. The most famous one includes a woman named Katy Freeman, whose advert is the longest-running of all appearing from 2003 and edited occasionally until 2009, who was walking into an office reception and did not know the floor was wet because there was no warning sign. As a result, she slipped and injured her knee. She then explains how worried she was about claiming, but was assured by the National Accident Helpline that they run on a no-win, no fee basis and got £5,000 in compensation. She is known for her fringe, which had been parodied by many. Another features a man named David Morris, who was unaware he received the wrong type of ladder whilst installing a fire alarm system in a house wall. The ladder slipped as he drilled and fell off, resulting in his left arm crushed and right shoulder dislocated. He received £7,500 in compensation, concluding he didn't even have to go to court.

Three new adverts began airing from 2006 in a modified format. Beginning with the accident with no name tag featuring the spokeswoman again and going back to the victim, saying how much they earned in compensation and what happened afterward. The Freeman and Morris adverts were re-edited to include the modified logo and music (except the last ten seconds faded out into the old jingle) while the others were dropped. All five were edited again in 2008 to feature another new logo and animation at the end.

Alongside the 2008 set, some new adverts aired featuring the spokeswoman (her last set of adverts) surrounded by accidents happening in reverse with the tagline "Accidents devastate lives, but who can help put the pieces back together again?" The adverts aired during late 2008 and throughout 2009 and are based on the same style used by Claims Direct for their adverts in 2001.

=== Underdog (2010–2017) ===
From 2010, adverts for National Accident Helpline no longer had the spokeswoman and instead took on a humorous tone. They feature a dog known as Underdog (voiced by Joe Pasquale), whose catchphrase is "I've had an accident!", trying to get compensation from an unseen man (voiced by Brian Blessed) who rejects him. Underdog then says that he will go to National Accident Helpline instead; the unseen man tries to convince him to go to him instead, which Underdog refuses.

In 2013, three brand new adverts aired along with the new computer-generated imagery from Aardman Animations, these adverts aired throughout 2014.

More new adverts came in through 2014 and 2015, with the 2015 adverts being National Accident Helpline's Justice vehicles, which Underdog gets onto.

=== Phone calls (2017–present) ===
As part of the company rebrand in 2017, adverts now focused on real calls taken from the company by accident victims explaining their story along with the caller telling them they'll look into the claim more. The ads feature the tagline "When it's wrong, make it right"

== Charity partnerships ==
National Accident Helpline has been involved in a number of charity partnerships.

It was announced in April 2014 that National Accident Helpline's new company charity was The Air Ambulance Service

The Brain Injury Rehabilitation Trust (BIRT), a member of Brainkind, was the company's charity for the year 2010-2011.

National Accident Helpline's employees have also been involved in a number of charity ventures. A team of four senior employees ran the 2010 London Marathon in aid of the Juvenile Diabetes Research Foundation, raising over £6000. Staff have also raised money for BIRT.
