= Joe Pasquale =

English comedian

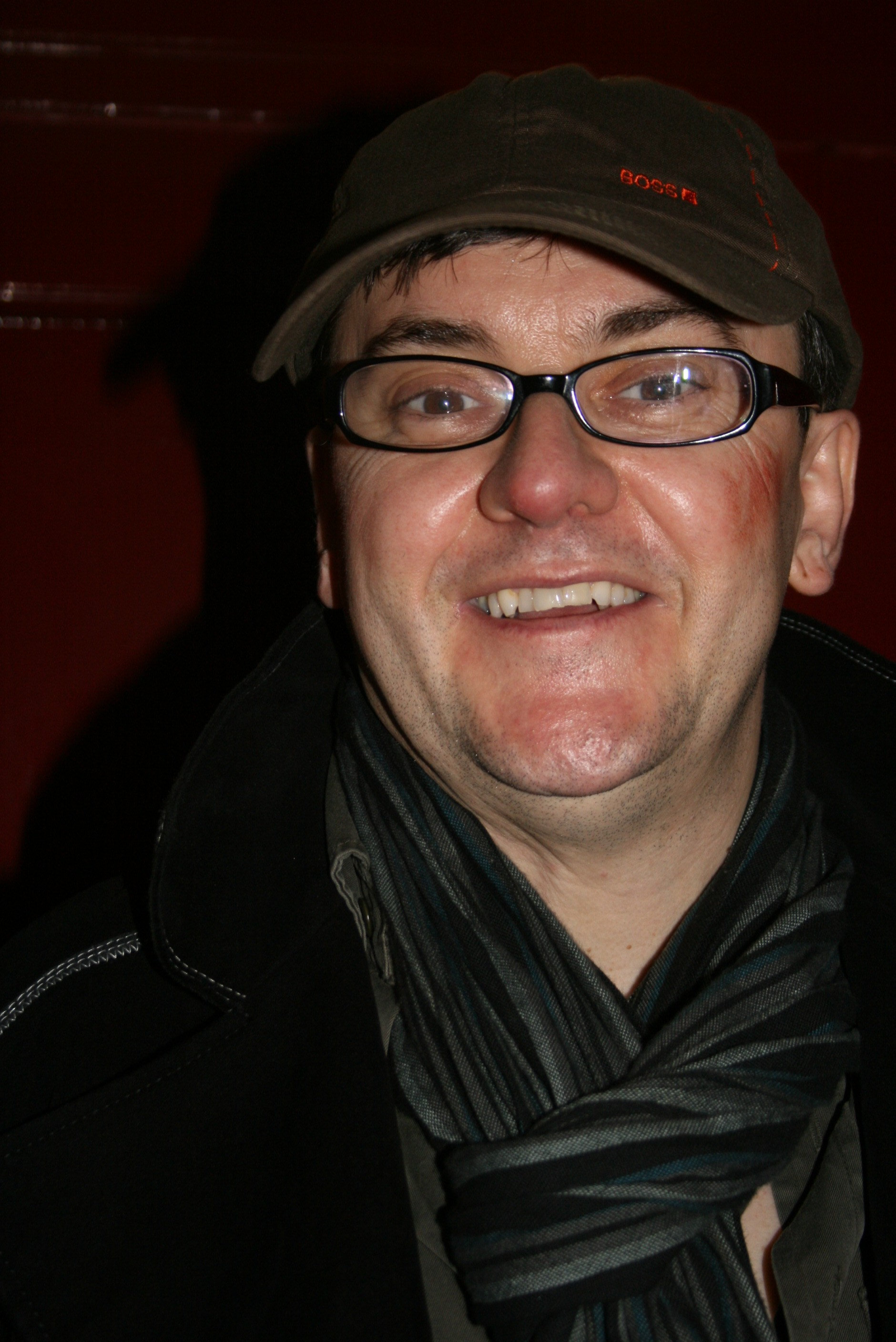
- Pasquale in 2007
- Born: Joseph Ellis Pasquale; 20 August 1961 (age 65); Grays, Essex, England
- Spouse: Alison Pasquale (1978–1986)
- Children: Joe Tracini

Comedy career
- Years active: 1987–present
- Occupations: Comedian, actor and television presenter
- Height: 5 ft 10 in (1.78 m)
- Website: joepasquale.com

Joseph Ellis Pasquale (born 20 August 1961) is an English comedian, actor and television presenter. He is well-known for his squeaky, high-pitched voice.

In 1987 he was the runner-up on the TV talent show New Faces, since then he has appeared in numerous TV and stage appearances, as well as stand-up shows, plays, musicals and pantomimes. In 2004 he went on to win the fourth series of I'm a Celebrity...Get Me Out of Here! and participated in the eighth series of Dancing on Ice in 2013. He also hosted the revived version of the game show The Price Is Right.

== Early life ==
Joseph Ellis Pasquale was born as the third of four children to Joe and Ethel. He is of Italian descent through his grandfather, who came to the United Kingdom soon after World War II. In a 2006 interview, Pasquale revealed: "He couldn't speak English, so he filled out the immigration form wrong. His Christian name was 'Pasquale', but he wrote it where his surname should have been. His actual surname was Trascini".

Pasquale attended Torrells Comprehensive School for his secondary education. At the age of 13, he got run over and broke his leg. Due to this, he skipped a year of schooling and could not do his exams.

Pasquale eventually left school aged 15 and took a series of dead-end jobs, including working at his father's margarine factory in Purfleet, a tea boy and errand boy in the civil service, porter at Smithfield meat market in London, working at the Ford Dagenham automotive plant, manning a garage forecourt, building site labourer, and a swimming pool attendant – despite not being able to swim.

He then got a job as a Greencoat at a Warner Holiday Camp in Lowestoft, where he became a bingo caller and refereed wrestling matches.

He later became Entertainments Manager at another Warner Holiday Camp, in Torquay.

== Career ==
=== Television ===
Pasquale rose to fame in 1987, when he appeared on New Faces. He auditioned as a bet with a friend, and every time he answered one of the director's questions, the judging panel laughed even more. A week later, his secretary at the holiday camp told him he would be competing. During the course of the series, Pasquale smashed a guitar, did magic tricks, and met Ken Dodd, who gave him a couple of jokes to perform, and he won the round immediately after the advice. He eventually finished runner-up.

On 28 December 1996 he starred in his own show The Joe Pasquale Show.

From 2007–2008, Pasquale voiced Nine the Cat in CBBC's adaptation of Frankenstein's Cat.

In March 2020, he guest starred in an episode of the BBC daytime soap opera Doctors as himself, in an episode titled "The Joe Pasquale Problem".

On 6 December 2004, he won the fourth series of the UK television show I'm a Celebrity... Get Me Out of Here!.

In January 2013, Pasquale became one of twelve celebrities participating in the eighth series of Dancing on Ice, with skating partner Vicky Ogden. They were eliminated on 10 February, claiming sixth place.

In 2025, he appeared as "The Maverick", a guest chaser on the ITV game show Beat the Chasers. He was masked and used a voice changer before revealing his identity at the end of the show. Pasquale also briefly appeared in the Taskmaster season 20 episode 'A 1970s camping kettle.', for which he recorded a bit for contestant Reece Shearsmith.

=== Stage ===
Pasquale has starred in numerous Christmas pantomimes for various venues across the UK.

In 1999, Pasquale made his stage acting debut in Larry Shue's The Nerd before playing Guildenstern in a UK tour of Tom Stoppard's Rosencrantz and Guildenstern Are Dead in 2004 and in 2007, Pasquale played Leo Bloom in the UK tour of Mel Brooks's musical The Producers opposite Cory English and Russ Abbot. He also played Tony Grimsdyke in a UK tour of Doctor in the House opposite Robert Powell in 2012 and played King Arthur in Monty Python's Spamalot at the Playhouse Theatre in London's West End on a UK tour from 2013 to 2016.

In 2018, Pasquale played Frank Spencer in Some Mothers Do 'Ave 'Em, based on the BBC sitcom, on a UK tour. In 2021, Pasquale played Al in John Godber's April in Paris on a UK tour opposite Sarah Earnshaw.

Pasquale joined Bradley Walsh, Brian Conley and Shane Richie as part of "The Prat Pack" for a one-night-only sold-out concert at the London Palladium on 30 March 2024. Following the Palladium concert, the four reunited to celebrate the opening of Fareham Live on 28 September 2024. The four will tour the UK in April and May 2025.

In August 2026, Pasquale will make his Edinburgh Fringe debut in 11½ Angry Men by Guy Unsworth at The Pleasance.

=== Allegations of plagiarism ===
Pasquale has been accused of joke theft by Stewart Lee, who incorporated his allegations as part of Lee's comedy routine. Frank Skinner accused Pasquale of plagiarism in 2010, in using a routine about a rollercoaster prank from one of Skinner's DVD performances.

=== Other work ===
Pasquale wrote the musical stage version of Rentaghost which toured the UK in 2006.

On 24 September 2005, the 30-minute Breakout Trust DVD, entitled "It's a Boy", was published. Pasquale starred as the voice of an Innkeeper named Garralus. Alongside him were performers such as Cannon and Ball and Sir Cliff Richard. The production was a new take on the nativity story and was released in time for Christmas 2005.

Pasquale performed the voice of a rat in the 2006 film Garfield 2, also as the voice of The Dentist in 2008's Horton Hears a Who!

Pasquale also provided the voice over for Underdog, a cartoon dog mascot of personal injury firm National Accident Helpline.

== Stage and screen credits ==
=== Theatre ===
==== Pantomime ====
Year	Title	Role	Venue
1992	Robinson Crusoe		Swansea Grand Theatre
1993	Sleeping Beauty	Muddles	Swansea Grand Theatre
1994	Aladdin	Wishee Washee	Swansea Grand Theatre
1995	Peter Pan	Smee	Cliffs Pavilion, Southend-on-Sea
1996	Peter Pan	Smee	Grand Theatre, Wolverhampton
1998	Peter Pan	Smee	Alhambra Theatre, Bradford
1999	Peter Pan	Smee	New Wimbledon Theatre
2000	Peter Pan	Smee	Alexandra Theatre, Birmingham
2001	Peter Pan	Smee	Wycombe Swan
2002	Peter Pan	Smee	Theatre Royal, Nottingham
2003	Jack and the Beanstalk	Jack	Derngate Theatre, Northampton
2004	Jack and the Beanstalk	Jack	Birmingham Hippodrome
2005	Peter Pan	Smee	Birmingham Hippodrome
2006	Peter Pan	Smee	Bristol Hippodrome
2007	Cinderella	Buttons	Cliffs Pavilion, Southend-on-Sea
2008	Peter Pan	Smee	Orchard Theatre, Dartford
2009	Sleeping Beauty	Muddles	Birmingham Hippodrome
2010	The Wizard of Oz	Scarecrow	UK tour
2010	Sleeping Beauty	Muddles	Theatre Royal, Plymouth
2011	Sleeping Beauty	Muddles	Theatre Royal, Nottingham
2012	Sleeping Beauty	Muddles	New Theatre, Cardiff
2013	Sleeping Beauty	Muddles	Grand Theatre, Wolverhampton
2014	Peter Pan	Smee	Derngate Theatre, Northampton
2015	Aladdin	Wishee-Washee	Mayflower Theatre, Southampton
2016	Snow White	Muddles	Orchard Theatre, Dartford
2017	Aladdin	Wishee-Washee	Bristol Hippodrome
2018	Peter Pan	Smee	Theatre Royal, Nottingham
2019	Aladdin	Wishee-Washee	Milton Keynes Theatre
2020	Sleeping Beauty	Muddles	Mayflower Theatre, Southampton
2021	Aladdin	Wishee-Washee	Theatre Royal, Plymouth
2022	Snow White	Muddles	Theatre Royal, Nottingham
2023	Peter Pan	Smee	Cliffs Pavilion, Southend-on-Sea
2024	Jack and the Beanstalk	Simon	New Wimbledon Theatre
2025	Aladdin	Frankie Manky	Swansea Grand Theatre
2026	Cinderella	Baron Hardup	Orchard Theatre, Dartford

==== Other theatre ====
Year	Title	Role	Venue
1999	The Nerd	Rick	UK tour
2004	Rosencrantz and Guildenstern Are Dead	Guildenstern	UK tour
2007	The Producers	Leo Bloom	UK tour
2012	Doctor in the House	Tony Grimsdyke	UK tour
2013	Spamalot	King Arthur	Playhouse Theatre, London
2013	Ha Ha Holmes!	Sherlock Holmes	UK tour
2014	Spamalot	King Arthur	Playhouse Theatre, London
2015	Spamalot	King Arthur	UK tour
2018	Some Mothers Do 'Ave 'Em	Frank Spencer	UK tour
2021	April in Paris	Al	UK tour
2022	Some Mothers Do 'Ave 'Em	Frank Spencer	UK tour
2025	Inside No. 9 Stage/Fright	Guest star (7 March only)	Wyndham's Theatre, London
2025	The Play What I Wrote	Guest star	Devonshire Park Theatre, Eastbourne
2025	Inside No. 9 Stage/Fright	Guest star (13 September only)	Milton Keynes Theatre
2026	11½ Angry Men	Juror 2	The Pleasance, Edinburgh Fringe

=== Stand-up VHS and DVDs ===
- Live and Squeaky (1996)
- Twin Squeaks (20 October 1997)
- The Crazy World of Joe Pasquale (26 October 1998)
- Bubble and Squeak (13 November 2000)
- The Everything I Have Ever Done & The First of Many Goodbye Tours (1 November 2004)
- Does He Really Talk Like That? The Live Show (21 November 2005)
- Return of the Love Monkey (20 November 2006)

== Personal life ==
Pasquale has overcome a fear of flying and has a pilot's licence. He studied Earth Sciences at the Open University and was hoping to graduate with a BSc degree in 2014. He moved to Norfolk in 2022.

Pasquale has had an interest in geology since childhood, but was unable to pursue qualifications due to missing his school exams after being hit by a car. On the recommendation of his friend Brian Blessed, he began an Open University course in geology; Blessed and Pasquale made a television pilot about geology in 2017, which was not broadcast.

On 5 August 2023, Pasquale revealed on Kate Thornton's White Wine Question Time podcast that he had accidentally impaled himself on a pair of prop moose antlers in Skegness. Pasquale, 61 at the time, described himself as "lucky to be alive", and recalled having tripped initially but then contorting evasively as he fell "like Tom Cruise in the new Mission Impossible film" to avert greater injury.

His son, Joe Tracini, is an actor and singer, known for playing Dennis Savage in Hollyoaks.

Preceded by Kerry Katona	I'm a Celebrity, Get Me Out of Here! Winner & King of the Jungle; 2004	Succeeded by Carol Thatcher
Preceded by Bruce Forsyth	Host of The Price Is Right; 2006–2007	Succeeded by Series ended
