= Eddie Large =

British comedian (1941–2020)

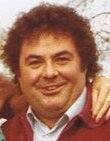
- Born: Edward Hugh McGinnis; 25 June 1941; Glasgow, Scotland
- Died: 2 April 2020 (aged 78); Bristol, England
- Notable work: The Little and Large Show
- Spouses: Sandra Baywood (m. 1965; div. 1979); Patsy Ann Scott (m. 1983)
- Children: 3

Comedy career
- Medium: Comedian

Edward Hugh McGinnis (25 June 1941 – 2 April 2020), better known by the stage name Eddie Large, was a British comedian. He was best known as one half of the double act Little and Large, with Syd Little (the stage name of Cyril Mead).

== Early life ==
Large was born Edward Hugh McGinnis in Glasgow in 1941. His father Teddy served as a Petty Officer in the Royal Navy during World War II and after he returned from the war the family moved to a tenement in Oatlands. When he was nine years old, the family moved again to Manchester, where he attended Claremont Road Primary School and a grammar school. He played football as a schoolboy, becoming a supporter of nearby Manchester City which had its ground opposite his home, and he maintained a lifelong devotion to the club. After he left school, he worked as an electrician and was a singer.

== Little and Large ==
Large met singer and guitarist Cyril Mead in the Stonemason's Arms pub in Timperley and they formed a double act following the reaction to Eddie's comic heckling of Cyril, who switched to comedy. The duo then performed in northern clubs, turning professional in 1963. As Little and Large, the two men began their television career on the talent show Opportunity Knocks winning in 1971 and starred in many television comedy programmes, including their own series The Little and Large Show and the ITV series Who Do You Do? doing impressions and also performing as pantomime stars.

In an interview in 2010, Large said that he and Syd Little had not spoken to each other for several years. During the 2010–11 football season, football entertainment show Soccer AM produced comedy sketches with Peterborough footballer Mark Little, and Eddie Large, as the newly reformed Little and Large.

== Later career ==
Large worked on the after-dinner circuit and, in the latter years of his life, performed some cameo acting roles in dramas such as The Brief and Blackpool. His autobiography, entitled Larger than Life, was published in 2005. In 2013, Large released his first single without Little, a parody of "Je t'aime... moi non plus" by Serge Gainsbourg entitled "Gee Musky... Moi Non Plus".

== Personal life and death ==
Large married his first wife, Sandra Baywood, in 1965. The marriage ended in divorce, with Large marrying his second wife, Patsy Scott, in 1983. Large lived in Portishead, near Bristol, with his wife Patsy and son. He also had two daughters and three grandchildren.

After being admitted to hospital in March 2002 due to kidney problems, Large underwent a heart transplant at Papworth Hospital, Cambridge in 2003 at the age of 62, and recovered fully. Large was hospitalised for some weeks in late 2013 after tripping over a road sign near his Portishead home.

Large died on 2 April 2020, aged 78 at Southmead Hospital in Bristol after contracting Covid19 while receiving treatment for heart failure. Large had suffered from kidney and heart problems for a number of years. Large's funeral took place at South Bristol Crematorium on 24 April 2020, in Bristol, with Syd Little in attendance, who said that Large was his "best friend".
