= Little and Large =

British comedy double act

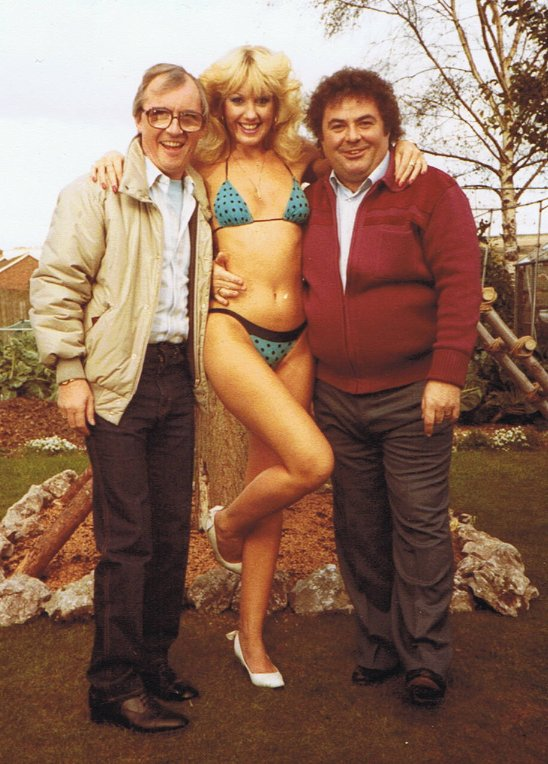
- Syd Little (left) with Eddie Large (right), and Susie Silvey
- Born: Edward Hugh McGinnis; 25 June 1941; Glasgow, Scotland; Cyril John Mead; 19 December 1942 (age 83); Blackpool, Lancashire, England
- Died: Edward Hugh McGinnis; 2 April 2020 (aged 78); Bristol, England
- Notable work: The Little and Large Show

Comedy career
- Years active: 1962–2003, 2018–2020
- Medium: Film; television; stand-up; music; books
- Genres: Observational comedy, musical comedy, satire
- Subjects: marriage; everyday life; current events; pop culture

Little and Large were a British comedy double act comprising straight man Syd Little (born Cyril John Mead; 19 December 1942) and comic Eddie Large (born Edward Hugh McGinnis; 25 June 1941 – 2 April 2020). They appeared in their own sketch comedy programmes on British television, including The Little and Large Show, from 1976 to 1991. Due to their physical characteristics and impersonations, the duo had them compared to a latter-day Laurel and Hardy.

== Comedy duo ==
They formed their partnership in 1962, originally appearing as singers in local pubs around north-west England. According to an interview with Eddie Large in Metro newspaper (11 January 2019), they went professional in October 1963. After deciding to concentrate on comedy, Little and Large's big break came in 1971 when they appeared on ITV talent show Opportunity Knocks.

They won the programme's vote, turning them into household names virtually overnight.

Within five years, the duo had their own prime-time show on ITV called The Little and Large Tellyshow. It began with a pilot episode in 1976, which earned the pair a commission for a series in 1977. However, the duo transferred to BBC1 with a new show called The Little and Large Show from 1978, and remained on the channel for more than a decade until its cancellation in 1991. At its peak, the series was watched by an estimated nearly 15 million people each week.

Eddie Large was generally the funny man while Syd Little was the more serious "straight guy". Eddie Large performed a number of impressions, particularly cartoon characters such as Popeye, Deputy Dawg, Fred Flintstone, Barney Rubble and Woody Woodpecker, while Syd Little simply stood next to him, looking perplexed and distressed. Large's onstage catchphrase (to describe Little) was "Supersonic".

They continued to appear in theatres and pantomimes, including Babes in the Woods, written by Ian Billings. The partnership's popularity peaked in the 1980s but, as mainstream comedy moved away from their pantomime style towards alternative comedy, it dwindled.

Eddie Large was told he might have a heart attack at any moment. The partnership split up when Large had to have a heart transplant.

Syd Little performed on cruise ships, such as the QE2, during September 2007, and used to run The "Little" Restaurant at the Strawberry Gardens pub and now runs a restaurant in the oldest pub in his home town Fleetwood, called The Steamer.

Eddie Large remained in showbusiness. Large said in a 2010 interview he had not spoken to Syd Little for several years. They did subsequently have a reunion in 2018 when they appeared on Ant & Dec's Saturday Night Takeaway, featuring in the sketch serial "Saturday Knight Takeaway", and in February 2019, appearing together on Pointless Celebrities.

On 2 April 2020, Eddie Large died after contracting coronavirus while receiving treatment for heart failure. Large had suffered from kidney and heart problems for a number of years.
