= Harrogate Theatre =

Historic performance hall and theatre in North Yorkshire, England

Coordinates: 53°59′40″N 1°32′24″W

Harrogate Theatre is a Grade II listed performance hall and theatre, located in Harrogate, North Yorkshire, England. It is a full hemp house theatre that uses a theatrical rigging system to fly components like curtains, lights and scenery on and off the stage. Unusually, however, the theatre does not have stage doors in the usual way. Instead, personnel enter through the main entrance, then a raised set of barn doors at the back of the building is used for the load-in/load-out.

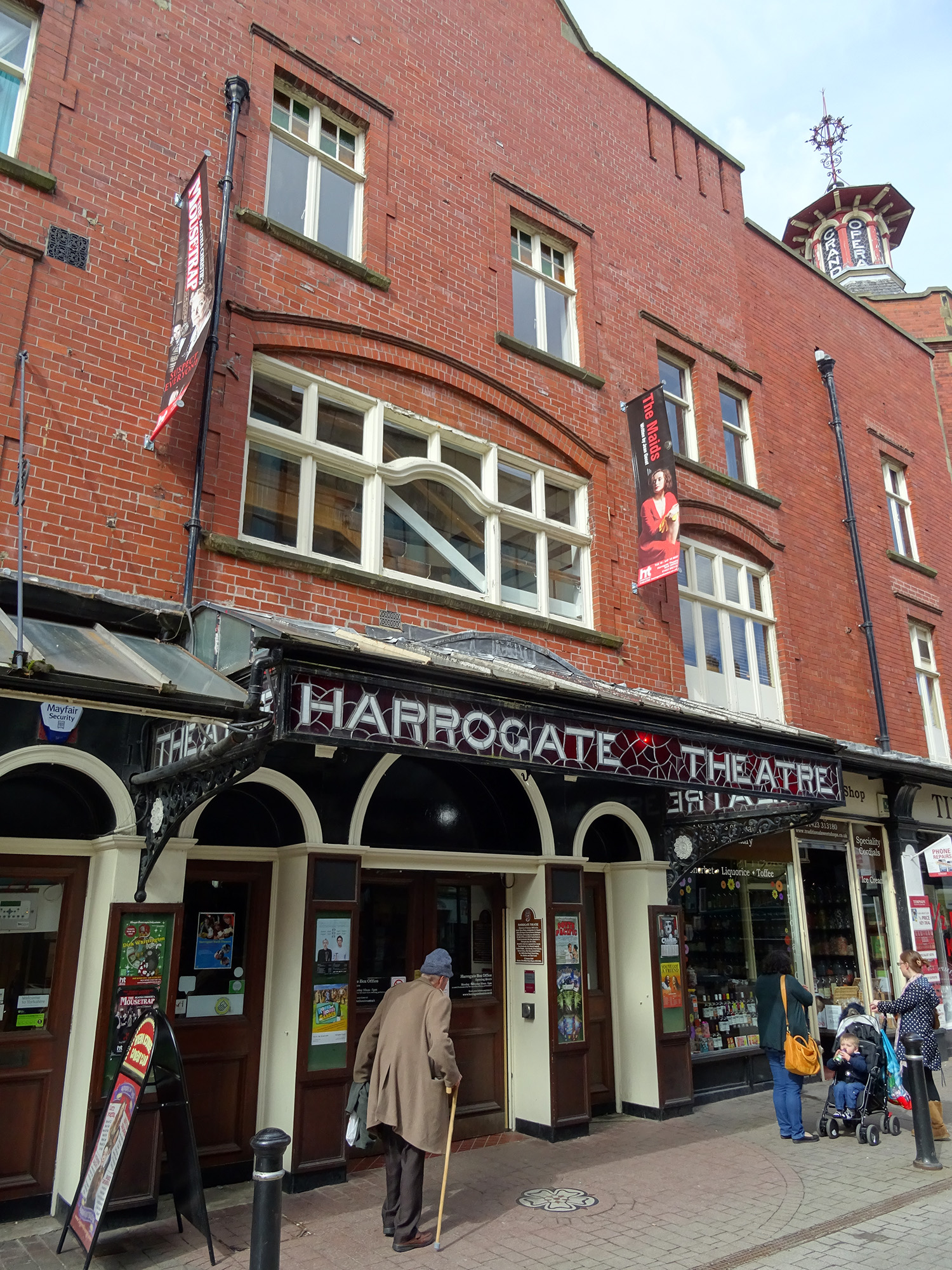
An image of Harrogate Theatre

A brown plaque is displayed outside the theatre paying tribute to some of the famous performers who have appeared on Harrogate Theatre's stage, including Sarah Bernhardt, Charlie Chaplin, Steve Harley and Cockney Rebel, Steve Harley (as a 4-man acoustic set, not as part of Cockney Rebel), Andy Parsons, Trevor Howard, George Robey, Ellen Terry, Fats Waller, Ken Dodd, Ben Kingsley and Eddie Izzard.

== History ==
The Harrogate Grand Opera House was designed by architect Frank Tugwell, whose other work includes the Futurist Theatre in Scarborough and the Savoy Theatre in London.

The building opened on 13 January 1900 with a charity performance for soldiers fighting in the Boer War. This was followed by a run of Mr J. Tully's pantomime, Dick Whittington. Harold Styan debuted there as a gymnast in 1911.

The theatre still possesses many of its original front of house fixtures and fittings, as well as a modelled plaster frieze by sculptor Frances Darlington in the foyer that depicts the development of arts through the ages.

== Harrogate Theatre Scenic Services ==
As was typical for a repertory theatre at the time, Harrogate Grand Opera house was home to an on-site workshop to build their sets. This was eventually set up as a commercial venture under the name of Harrogate Theatre Scenic Services (HTSS) and it is now a dedicated workshop located in Starbeck, Harrogate. HTSS constructs and delivers bespoke sets for venues and companies, both in the UK and internationally. It operates with an experienced team of woodworkers, metalworkers, scenic artists and sculptors.

== Harrogate Youth Theatre ==
Harrogate Theatre runs a comprehensive program of activities to engage children and young people aged between 3 and 18 in theatre. It offers training in drama, singing and playwriting, with 10-week terms in the autumn, spring and summer.

The Youth Theatre is currently based in HIVE, a dedicated space located next to the Harrogate Theatre building.

== See also ==
- Listed buildings in Harrogate (Low Harrogate Ward)
