= It's All Happening (film) =

1963 British film by Don Sharp

- Original British quad poster
- Directed by: Don Sharp
- Written by: Leigh Vance
- Produced by: Norman Williams
- Starring: Tommy Steele; Michael Medwin; Angela Douglas
- Cinematography: Ken Hodges
- Edited by: John Jympson
- Music by: Philip Green; John Barry
- Production company: K.N.P. Productions
- Distributed by: British Lion Film Corporation
- Release date: 1963
- Running time: 86 minutes
- Country: United Kingdom
- Language: English
- Budget: $430,000

It's All Happening (also known as The Dream Maker) is a 1963 British musical film directed by Don Sharp and starring Tommy Steele, Michael Medwin and Angela Douglas. It was written by Leigh Vance.

== Premise ==
A talent scout for a record company is frustrated by his lack of progress with his career. When the orphanage where he was brought up is threatened with closing, he decides to organize a concert featuring all the most up-to-date singers and bands.

== Selected cast ==
- Tommy Steele as Billy Bowles
- Michael Medwin as Max Catlin
- Angela Douglas as Julie Singleton
- Jean Harvey as Delia
- Bernard Bresslaw as Parsons
- Walter Hudd as J.B. Magdeburg
- John Tate as Julian Singleton
- Janet Henfrey as April
- Richard Goolden as Lord Sweatstone
- Keith Faulkner as Mick
- Edward Cast as Hugh
- Anthony Dawes as Cyril Bong

== Production ==
Produced for $430,000, the film was shot and ready for release in cinemas in only six weeks. Director Don Sharp had made a similar musical The Golden Disc (1958).

Don Sharp was directing television when approached to work on the film. He says he was brought on to the film by Philip Green, who had worked with Sharp on Ha Penny Breeze (1950). According to Sharp, Green was music director for EMI and suggested they record tracks for their recording artists, which formed the basis of the film. Sharp says the film featured most of EMI's key artists at the time.

Filming took place at Shepperton Studios in January 1963. Angela Douglas, who has a leading role, recalled in her memoirs that Steele "was terrific, making me feel good, putting me at ease" and that "they were a marvelous crew, fun and relaxed."

== Songs ==
- "The Wind And The Rain" by Johnny De Little
- "The Dream Maker" by Tommy Steele
- "Meeting You" by Dick Kallman
- "Maximum Plus" by Tommy Steele and Marion Ryan
- "Somebody Else Not Me" by Shane Fenton and the Fentones
- "Egg And Chips" by Tommy Steele
- "That's Livin' as That's Lovin'" by Marion Ryan
- "Day Without You" by Danny Williams
- "Flamenco" by Russ Conway
- "Summertime" by Philip Green, Norman Newell
- "Once Upon A Time In Venice" by as John Boulter
- "It's Summer" by Dai Francis
- "Watching All The World Go By" by Tony Mercer
- "The Boy On The Beach" by Carol Deene
- "It's Summer" by The George Mitchell Singers
- Finale "The Dream Maker" by Tommy Steele And The George Mitchell Singers

== Critical reception ==
The Monthly Film Bulletin wrote: "By all natural laws, this film ought to sink in a soggy mess of cliché and sentimentality. The fact that it doesn't is almost entirely due to Tommy Steele's ebullient, sincere and immensely likeable performance, which manages to make even its most shopworn situations seem almost fresh. The direction is sound, the settings attractive, and there are nice supporting performances by Angela Douglas, Bernard Bresslaw and Jean Harvey to back him up. But that tired old script, topped up by some unpleasant scenes jibing at an ugly girl, and an over-long final parade of singers, makes the uphill grind rather too hard, even for Tommy Steele. Someday soon, someone ought to put him in a film worthy of his talent."

Variety said "The warmly exuberant personality of Tommy Steele, plus some polished, slick performances by guest top pop United Kingdom artists, solidly jacks up a lazy, old-fashioned and flabby screenplay by Leigh Vance."

TV Guide said of the film: "a number of England's pop singers and groups of the 1960s are on display in this variety show held together by a slim story line"."

The New York Times observed, "Young Mr. Steele, all teeth and yellow hair, gives his all to the role."

The Radio Times called the film "sentimental hokum...The songs sound as though they were knocked out on a slow afternoon on Denmark Street, London's very own Tin Pan Alley."

AllMovie called it an "engaging children's musical."
