= Futurist Theatre =

Theatre in Scarborough, North Yorkshire, England

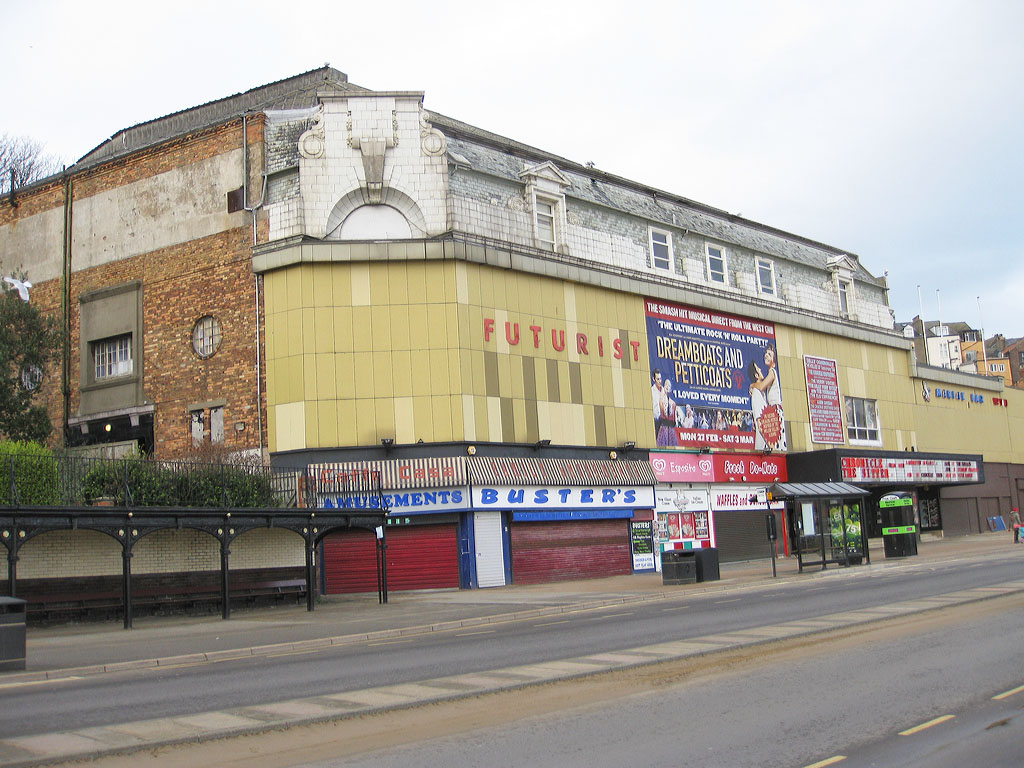
- Interactive map of Futurist Theatre
- Address: Foreshore Road; Scarborough, North Yorkshire; England
- Coordinates: 54.282360°N 0.394000°W
- Owner: Scarborough Borough Council
- Capacity: 2,155
- Current use: Demolished (2018)

Construction
- Opened: 1921
- Closed: 2014
- Years active: 93
- Architect: Frank Tugwell

The Futurist Theatre was a theatre and cinema in Scarborough, North Yorkshire, England. It was located on Foreshore Road, on the sea front of the South Bay.

The Futurist Theatre was built to the design of Scarborough architect Frank Tugwell and opened on 27 June 1921 as a cine-variety theatre operated by William Catlin (Catlin Entertainments Ltd). The Futurist could seat 2,393.

Originally it boasted a grandiose, ornate façade of robust, self-cleaning white glazed Carraraware tiles, the design of Henry Doulton, although this was later obscured during spring 1968 by a 'facelift' of rectangular plain yellow cladding. However, once the cladding was removed (under cover) around 2018, the tiles were judged to still be in a reasonable condition for their age.

Its fitting out included an Abbott and Smith 3 Manual 45 stop organ, played by Horace Shepherd. By the end of 1929, a Western Electric sound system had been installed to the cinema, and 1954 saw the addition of a CinemaScope and 38-feet wide screen.

Plans for a radical stage redesign by Captain J. H. Ritson were approved in early November 1957, stretching it a further four feet into the auditorium. Extra dressing rooms were to be positioned on the roof of the Arcadia/Palladium next door and the organ removed. This was undertaken from September 1958 once the twice nightly 'The Cyril Stapleton Band Show' had finished and although Plaxtons Builders kept at it 24 hours a day in the final weeks, they still overran – allowing the next summer production a single stage rehearsal before its opening night! During this redevelopment, film showings ceased.

Another dramatic change came about during late 1966/early 1967, courtesy of architects Cassidy, Farrington & Dennys, when the stage was lengthened 15 feet backward into the former Arcadia/Palladium auditorium, which also added a stage tower.

The Beatles performed there twice, on 11 December 1963 and on 9 August 1964. The popular The Black and White Minstrel Show performed there many times when it was owned (between 1966 and 1974) by Robert Luff, the producer of the stage version. The extension to the stage meant the closure of the adjacent Arcadia Theatre, which became a lounge.

A new Todd-AO system integrated in May 1968 allowed the Futurist to begin showing films again.

Around the same time, a balcony was mounted above the circle allowing the theatre to accommodate 2,155 seats. The Futurist had the twelfth-largest capacity of a theatre in the country, and the fifth-largest outside London.

During the 1980s, Scarborough Borough Council took over the property and leased the theatre to Apollo Leisure Ltd (UK), which ran it until September 2002.

In December 2002, Barrie C. Stead, who also runs the Hollywood Plaza cinema, took over the Futurist and refurbished the theatre and cinema, installing new projectors, DTS sound system and a new CinemaScope screen.

Annually, the theatre predominately maintained consistent acts throughout the months of July and August.

In the winter of 2011, the Futurist managed to attract over 16,000 people during eight sell-out performances of Calendar Girls produced by Dafydd Rogers and David Pugh.

The theatre closed on 6 January 2014 after the operator's lease expired. On 9 January 2017, Scarborough Borough Council voted to demolish the theatre, by the narrowest of margins (22–21). The decision was a controversial one, as not all the councillors voted, and many locals and visitors alike, would have preferred the venue to be saved, restored and modernised. The building was demolished by August 2018. The fate of the site is uncertain. However, interest has been shown from the Flamingoland group, who gave a large donation to the incumbent conservative party prior to the ramping up of the parties campaign to demolish the building. Demolition of the building began in June 2018 and was completed in August 2018. The demolition and associated land works cost local taxpayers £3.91 million.

Plans for a new FlamingoLand attraction on the site were revealed in February 2019. Gordon Gibb, Chief Executive of Flamingoland, announced in January 2022 that the company had reluctantly withdrawn its interest in the site, due to differences in development plans between the company and the local council.
