= Bramcote Tennis Pavilion =

Historic tennis pavilion in Scarborough, England

Coordinates: 54°16′12″N 0°23′51″W

Bramcote Tennis Pavilion is a historic former tennis pavilion in Scarborough, North Yorkshire, England.

The Pavilion was built in 1885 for the North of England Lawn Tennis Club and designed by John Hall.

In 2017, the pavilion was designated a Grade II listed building, with Historic England describing it as a rare surviving example of an early purpose-built lawn tennis pavilion.

== Conservation ==
In 2024, the Victorian Society added Bramcote Tennis Pavilion to its list of endangered buildings. Repair works began in 2025.
