= John Hall (architect) =

British architect

John Hall (1851 – 16 December 1914) was a British architect.

Born in York, Hall moved to Scarborough in about 1872 and became an architect. He specialised in domestic architecture and designed numerous houses in the town. Frank Tugwell and Edwin Cooper both trained under him, with Tugwell becoming a partner in his firm. He also served as an alderman and a justice of the peace in the town.

Hall's son, John Percy Hall, became an architect.

== Death ==
Hall was killed in the German bombardment of Scarborough in December 1914, the oldest victim in the town. His funeral was held at the Falsgrave Wesleyan Chapel, with attendees including Walter Rea. In 2021, a plaque was erected to mark his death.

== Work ==
Hall's work in Scarborough includes:

- Bramcote Tennis Pavilion 1885
- West Pier Sales Offices 1886
- Holbeck House 1889
- Gladstone Road Schools 1890
- Normanton Rise 1894
- Scarborough College 1898
- 1-13 Gas Cottages 1899
- Norbury and Moorend 1901
- Sea Croft Mansions
- National Provincial Bank
