= Newcastle Packet =

Pub in Scarborough, North Yorkshire, England

Coordinates: 54°17′03″N 0°23′29″W

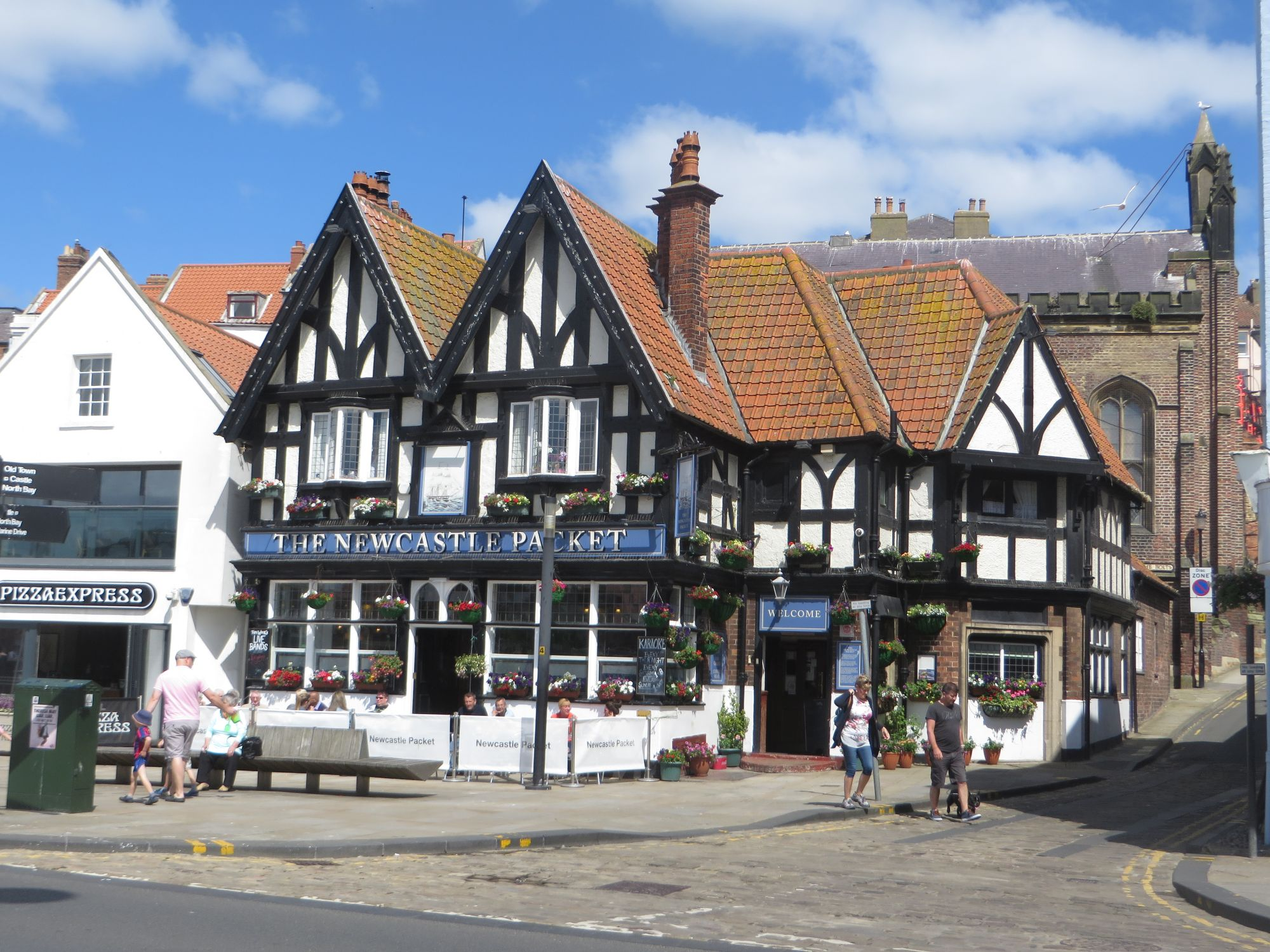
The pub, in 2017

The Newcastle Packet is a historic pub in Scarborough, North Yorkshire, a town in England.

A large timber-framed house was built on Sandside in about 1500. The building included a canopy with Gothic carvings, the word "Justicia", and battlements. A fragment of wall in the cellar was supposed to have been part of the Scarborough Town Wall. In about 1725 the centre and west wing were refronted, while serving as the post office. In about 1830 the east wing was refronted and converted into a shop, while the remainder became the Newcastle Packet inn. The centre and west wings of the building were demolished in the late 19th century, and a new pub was constructed between 1898 and 1899, to a design by Frank Tugwell. The new structure reuses some of the 16th-century timber, which may have originally been salvaged from ships. The east wing was rebuilt in about 1920, and incorporated into the pub. The building was grade II listed in 1953. Parts of the 2019 BBC television series Scarborough were filmed in the pub.

The left side of the pub incorporates carved timber framing dating from about 1500. The rest of the building is built of brick and stucco with applied modern timber framing, and has a tile roof. It has two storeys and an irregular plan, with a front of two gabled bays. The ground floor has a central doorway and is almost completely glazed. The windows on the upper floor have four lights, the middle two lights being slightly bowed on a timber bracket. The extension to the right has a splayed gable. The interior has been redesigned.

== See also ==
- Listed buildings in Scarborough (Castle Ward)
