= Frank Tugwell =

British architect (1861–1940)

Frank Alfred Tugwell
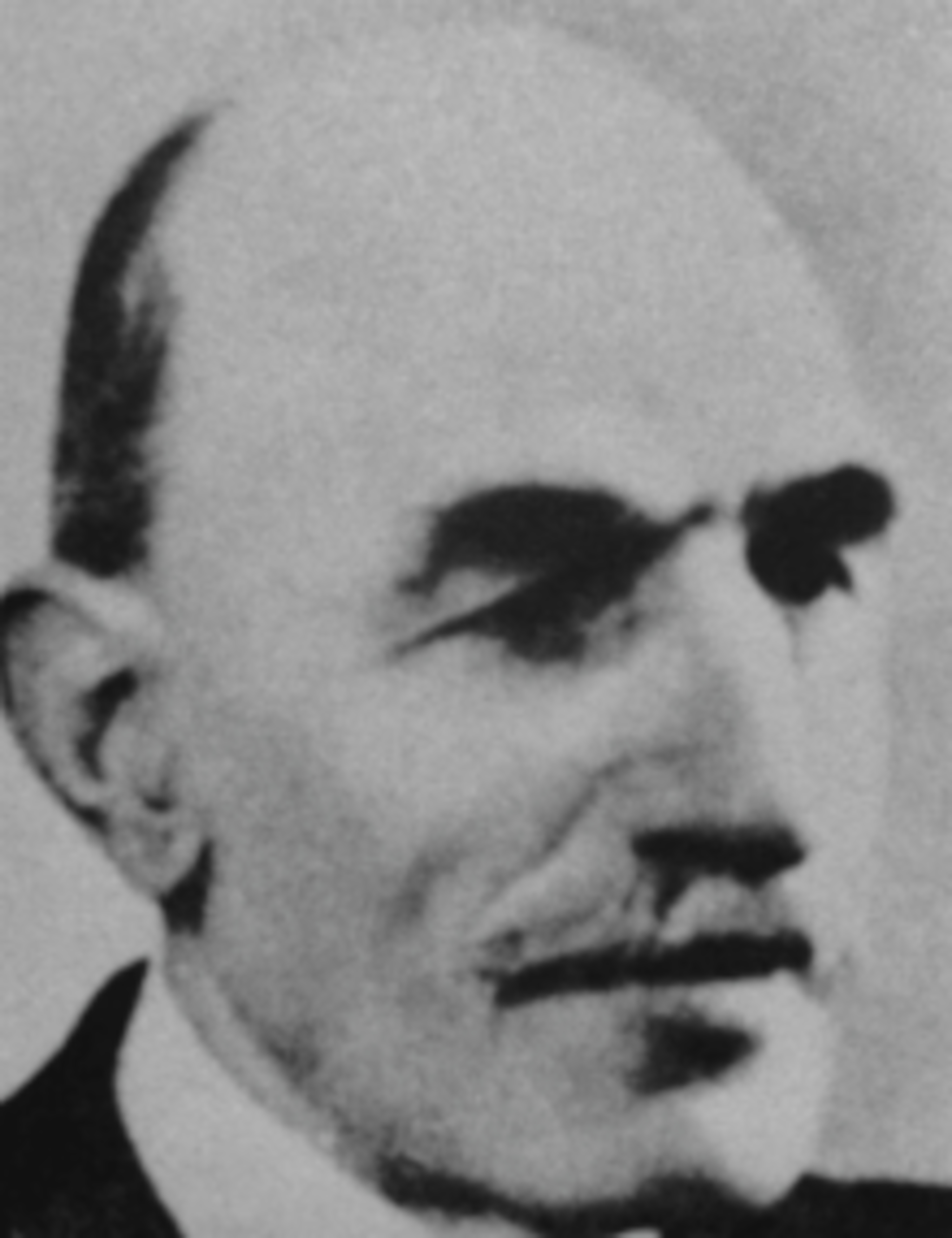
- Tugwell in c. 1910
- Born: July 1861; Scarborough, England
- Died: 20 March 1940 (aged 78)
- Occupation: Architect
- Buildings: Harrogate Theatre (1900); York Theatre Royal (1902); Savoy Theatre, London (1929); Scarborough Spa ballroom (1925)

Frank Alfred Tugwell (July 1861 – 20 March 1940) was a British architect.

== Background ==
Born in Scarborough, Tugwell attended the Scarborough High School for Boys. He then studied architecture under John Hall, while also attending the Scarborough School of Art. During the First World War, Tugwell's son Geoffrey Arnold Tugwell was killed in action on 23 April 1917. Tugwell died at home at 40, Esplanade, Scarborough, following a five-year retirement from architecture. He left £19,858 gross (equivalent to £2,311,289.79 in 2025).

== Career ==
According to the Yorkshire Post, Tugwell practised as an architect in Scarborough and London for almost fifty years. He next became an assistant to E. R Robson, and in 1886 became an associate of the Royal Institute of British Architects. He returned to Scarborough and entered into partnership with Hall. Together, they designed numerous houses in the town and also renovated many of its pubs. He built 4–6 Holbeck in 1895 as his own house, but soon moved elsewhere.

Between 1896 and 1898, Tugwell worked with W. E. Barry and Sydney Tugwell, his younger brother. He then worked on his own, mostly in the arts and crafts style, and also became known for designing theatres, in Harrogate, Manchester, London and other areas. The Yorkshire Post suggested that the Shaftesbury Theatre in London in 1911 was "his work", although that building is credited to Bertie Crewe in 1911. It is possible that Tugwell renovated or extended the 1888 Shaftesbury Theatre in 1911. He did, however, rebuild the Savoy Theatre in 1929.

== Institutions and civic duty ==
Tugwell was active in the Conservative Party and served on the North Riding County Council (NRCC) from 1900 until 1928. He was an original member of the Higher Education Committee from 1903, and its chairman between 1929 and 1940, taking a "keen interest in higher education" according to the Yorkshire Post. In this role in 1939, he "played a leading part in the provision of the New Girls' High School buildings just after the outbreak of war". He was elected as representative of Scarborough for the NRCC on 19 June 1900, and nominated for the same position on 24 February 1919. He also served as president of Old Scarborians RUFC. On 8 March 1926, his name was added to the Commission of the Peace for Scarborough, as a magistrate. Tugwell was a traveller, antiquary and archaeologist in his spare time.

== Legacy ==
When the Damask Room at Temple Newsam was renovated in 1940, Tugwell's wife donated in her husband's memory a bureau cabinet, described by the Yorkshire Post as a "grandiose" mahogany office desk, "evidently by the same cabinet-maker" of the Castletown Bureau at Castletown House.

"Touchstone" of the Harrogate Advertiser commented that:

At a time when England was slowly and for the most part reluctantly throwing off the shackles of the Victorian age, Mr Tugwell was always mercifully ahead of the times, and his work still looks refreshingly modern and up-to-date even in these stream-lined days.

== Works ==
Tugwell's work includes:

- West Pier Sales Offices (1886)
- Gladstone Road Schools (1890)
- Brookholme (1894)
- Normanton Rise (1894)
- Yew Court extension, Scalby (1895)
- Newcastle Packet (1898–1899)
- Harrogate Theatre (1898–1900)
- Manor Road Cemetery Lodge and Chapel (1901)
- Tyneholme (1902)
- York Theatre Royal rebuilding (1902)
- Nags Head, Scalby (1904)
- Wesleyan Methodist Church (1905)
- Homegreen (1907)
- George V Coronation Clock (1911)
- Futurist Theatre (1921)
- Hawkwood Court (1924)
- Scarborough Spa ballroom (1925)
- Savoy Theatre, London (1929)
- Hole in the Wall pub
- National Provincial Bank
- St Aubyns and Coppins, Scalby
