= The Black and White Minstrel Show =

British BBC TV light entertainment show (1958–1978)

- Created by: George Mitchell
- Starring: George Chisholm; Stan Stennett; Leslie Crowther
- Country of origin: United Kingdom
- Original language: English

Production
- Production locations: London, England

Original release
- Network: BBC
- Release: 14 June 1958 – 21 July 1978

The Black and White Minstrel Show was a British light entertainment show on BBC prime-time television that ran from 1958 to 1978. The weekly variety show presented traditional American minstrel and country songs, as well as show tunes and music hall numbers, lavish costuming and with most male cast members in blackface. A popular stage show, based on the TV show with the same title, ran from 1962 to 1972 at the Victoria Palace Theatre, London. This was followed by tours of UK seaside resorts until 1989, and tours in Australia and New Zealand. From early in its history, and increasingly throughout its run, the show received criticism for its racist premise and content.

== History ==
Minstrel shows had become a long-established feature of British music halls and seaside entertainment since the success of acts such as the Virginia Minstrels in Liverpool in the 1840s and Christy's Minstrels in London in the 1850s. These led directly to many British imitators, such as Hamilton's Black and White Minstrels in the 1880s and many others, with Uncle Mac's Minstrels becoming such a popular mainstay in Broadstairs, Kent, from the 1890s to the 1940s that a plaque was erected to honour their memory. Though any development in the performance of such acts may have ended before the First World War, the "old-time" minstrel theme remained a consistently popular form of entertainment in the UK well into the 1950s.

The Black and White Minstrel Show was created by BBC producer George Inns, working with George Mitchell. It began as a one-off special in 1957 called The 1957 Television Minstrels, featuring the male Mitchell Minstrels (Mitchell was the musical director) and the female Television Toppers dancers. The show was first broadcast on the BBC on 14 June 1958. It developed into a regular 45-minute show on Saturday evening prime-time television in a sing-along format, with both solo and minstrel pieces (often with extended segueing), some country and western numbers, and music derived from other foreign folk cultures. The male minstrels performed in blackface; the female dancers and other supporting artists did not. The show included comedy interludes performed by Leslie Crowther, George Chisholm and Stan Stennett. It was initially produced by George Inns with George Mitchell. The minstrels' main soloists were baritone Dai Francis, tenor John Boulter, and bass Tony Mercer. During the nine years that the show was broadcast in black and white, the blackface makeup was actually red, as black did not register as well.

The series gained considerable international regard and was sold to over thirty countries; in 1961 the show won a Golden Rose at Montreux for best light entertainment programme, and its first three albums of recordings (1960–1962) were all hits, the first two being long-running number 1 albums in the UK Albums Chart. The first of these became the first album in UK album sales history to pass 100,000 sales. By 1964, The Black and White Minstrel Show was achieving audience figures of 21 million.

In the spring of 1962, the BBC musical variety show The Black and White Minstrel Show opened at the Victoria Palace Theatre. The three lead singers of the television show, Mercer, Boulter and Francis, appeared simultaneously in the theatrical version, but the chorus singers and dancers were different groups. The stage show was produced by Robert Luff, and ran for 6,477 performances from 1962 to 1972; The Guinness Book of Records listed it as the stage show seen by the largest number of people. In Melbourne in 1962, a production of the show ran for three years, and set Australian and New Zealand box office records.

While it started off being broadcast in black and white, the TV show was first shown in colour on BBC2 in 1967. Several personalities guested on the show, whilst others started their careers on it. Comedian Lenny Henry, then in his teens, became the first black performer to appear on it in 1975. In July 2009, Henry explained that he was contractually obliged to perform and regretted his part in the show, telling The Times in 2015 that his appearance on the show led to a profound "wormhole of depression", and that he regretted his family not intervening to prevent him from continuing in the show.

== Denunciation as racist ==
Within five years of the show's premiere on UK television, its portrayal of blacked-up characters behaving with stereotypical African-American manners was considered offensive and racist. After William Lewis Moore, a white Congress of Racial Equality member, was murdered in 1963 in Alabama while protesting against racial segregation in the American South, the satirical show That Was the Week That Was parodied The Black and White Minstrel Show's trivialisation of the systematic racism there. The sketch had Millicent Martin dressed as Uncle Sam singing a parody of "I Wanna Go Back to Mississippi" ("Where the Mississippi mud / Kind of mingles with the blood / Of the niggers that are hanging from the branches of the trees") accompanied by minstrel singers in blackface ("Mississippi, it's the state you've gotta choose / Where we hate all the darkies and the Catholics and the Jews / Where we welcome any man / Who is strong and white and belongs to the Ku Klux Klan").

David Hendy, professor of media and cultural history at the University of Sussex, comments that Barrie Thorne, the corporation's chief accountant, described the series in an internal memo to Director of Television Kenneth Adam in 1962 as being "a disgrace and an insult to coloured people". He continued: "If black faces are to be shown, for heaven's sake let coloured artists be employed and with dignity". Thorne raised the issue again in 1967 with Oliver Whitley, chief assistant to the BBC's director general, Sir Hugh Greene. Whitley responded: "The best advice that could be given to coloured people by their friends would be: 'On this issue, we can see your point, but in your own best interests, for heaven's sake, shut up.'"

In 1967, the Campaign Against Racial Discrimination presented a petition to the BBC calling for the show to be cancelled. The following year, the BBC experimented with a version of the show called Masquerade, in which the main singers appeared without blackface, and the black singers wore whiteface. In 1969, due to continuing accusations of racism, Music Music Music, a spin-off series in which the minstrels appeared without their blackface make-up, replaced The Black and White Minstrel Show. However, after one series, The Black and White Minstrel Show returned.

Since its cancellation in 1978, The Black and White Minstrel Show has come to be regarded with disdain. BBC writer Kate Broome said, "That an innocently-intentioned show could, in just a generation, become such a screen pariah is one of the most extraordinary episodes in television history".

== Final years ==
The BBC1 television programme was cancelled in 1977 as part of a reduction in variety programming and amid the accusations of racism, though a series of specials was broadcast in 1978, after which the series was taken off the air for good. The stage version toured continuously from 1960 until 1987, with a second company touring Australia and New Zealand from 1962 to 1965, 1969 to 1971, and 1978 to 1979. Having left the Victoria Palace Theatre, where the stage show played from 1962 to 1972, a second show toured almost every year to various big city and seaside resort theatres around the UK, including the Futurist in Scarborough, the Winter Gardens in Morecambe, the Festival Theatre in Paignton, the Congress Theatre in Eastbourne and the Pavilion Theatre in Bournemouth. This continued annually until 1989, when a final tour of three Butlins resorts (Minehead, Bognor Regis, and Barry Island) saw the last official Black and White Minstrel Show staged. A charity group that "replicated" the TV show, the Angus Black and White Minstrels, conducted a stage show in Arbroath, Scotland, authorised by the The Black and White Minstrel Show's producers, beginning in 1960 and only discontinued blackface in 2005; it ceased operations in 2019.

== Legacy ==
In a 1971 episode of The Two Ronnies, a musical sketch, "The Short and Fat Minstrel Show", was performed as a parody of The Black and White Minstrel Show, featuring spoofs of various songs. An episode of the BBC comedy series The Goodies ("Alternative Roots"), spoofed the positive reception of The Black and White Minstrel Show, suggesting that any programme could double its viewing figures by being performed in blackface, and mentioning that a series of The Black and White Minstrel Show had been tried without makeup. The Are You Being Served? episode "Roots" featured a storyline in which Mr. Grace's lineage was traced in order to perform an appropriate song and dance for his 90th birthday. The result was a number that parodied The Black and White Minstrel Show by having the male performers in blackface, while the females (excluding Mrs. Slocombe) were not.

In 2023 the BBC broadcast a documentary presented by the actor David Harewood and the historian David Olusoga about the pernicious influence of blackface minstrelsy in promoting racial stereotypes and anti-black racism in Great Britain. The documentary used the BBC's own The Black and White Minstrel Show as a focus of discussion, and was heavily critical of it.

== Discography ==
=== The Black and White Minstrel Show ===
Chart	Year	Peak position
UK Albums Chart	1961	1
UK Albums Chart	1962	1
UK Albums Chart	1963	1

Preceded by South Pacific by Original Soundtrack; South Pacific by Original Soundtrack; South Pacific by Original Soundtrack; The Shadows by The Shadows; Out of the Shadows by The Shadows	UK Albums Chart number-one album 29 July 1961 – 26 August 1961; 2 September 1961 – 9 September 1961; 16 September 1961 – 23 September 1961; 21 October 1961 – 28 October 1961; 29 December 1962 – 12 January 1963	Succeeded by South Pacific by Original Soundtrack; South Pacific by Original Soundtrack; The Shadows by The Shadows; The Shadows by The Shadows; West Side Story by Original Soundtrack

=== Another Black and White Minstrel Show ===
Chart	Year	Peak position
UK Albums Chart	1961	1
UK Albums Chart	1962	1

Preceded by 21 Today by Cliff Richard	UK Albums Chart number-one album 11 November 1961 – 6 January 1962	Succeeded by Blue Hawaii by Elvis Presley

=== On Stage with the George Mitchell Minstrels ===
Chart	Year	Peak position
UK Albums Chart	1962	1

Preceded by Out of the Shadows by The Shadows	UK Albums Chart number-one album 1 December 1962 – 15 December 1962	Succeeded by West Side Story by Original Soundtrack

=== Other albums ===
Title	Year	UK
On Tour with the George Mitchell Minstrels	1963	6
Spotlight on the George Mitchell Minstrels	1964	6
Magic of the Minstrels	1965	9
Here Come the Minstrels	1966	11
Showtime Special	1967	26
The Irving Berlin Songbook	1968	33
The Magic of Christmas	1970	32
The Black and White Minstrels With the Joe Loss Orchestra – 30 Golden Greats	1977	10
