= Robert Luff =

British producer (1914–2009)

- Born: Robert Charles William Luff; 7 July 1914; Bedford, England
- Died: 18 February 2009 (aged 94)
- Education: Bedford Modern School
- Occupations: Theatrical agent and producer
- Known for: producer of The Black and White Minstrel Show former agent of Lenny Henry and Beryl Reid

Robert Charles William Luff, CBE (7 July 1914 – 18 February 2009) was a British theatrical agent and producer. He was most notable for producing the stage version of The Black and White Minstrel Show, and being the former agent of Lenny Henry, the Tiller Girls and Beryl Reid. He successfully owned theatres and hotels in Scarborough, Bournemouth, Morecambe and Eastbourne.

== Personal life ==
The son of an engineer, Luff was born in Bedford, and educated at Bedford Modern School. Whilst there he learned to play the drums and later formed his own dance band, briefly known as Robert Luff and the Piccadilly Players until he received a writ from a lawyer representing the more famous Piccadilly Players. As a fan of big band music, he eventually branched out into booking bands in and around his home town. In 1995, he was awarded a CBE for his services to charities such as the St John Ambulance. Luff also invested large sums of his own money in the Royal Brompton Hospital, for research into cystic fibrosis.
