= John Boulter =

British tenor (1931–2025)

John Michael Boulter (3 August 1931 – 1 December 2025) was a British tenor best known for his appearances as a soloist in the BBC's long-running variety series The Black and White Minstrel Show. Along with bass Tony Mercer and baritone Dai Francis, Boulter was one of the show's three front men.

== Early life ==
Boulter was born on 3 August 1931 in Gillingham, Kent, and was educated at Gillingham Grammar School and later at Number One School of Technical Training in the Royal Air Force. From there he entered the Royal Academy of Music where he won gold, silver and bronze medals for his singing and was awarded an associateship of the academy in recognition of his work. He was an "apprentice Airframe Fitter" in the RAF before becoming a professional singer.

== Career ==
In 1960, Boulter appeared in a South African production of Lock Up Your Daughters after he had joined the George Mitchell Minstrels during the 1950s. He went on to appear in the stage and television versions of The Black and White Minstrel Show and on recordings made by the troupe. He also appeared in the 1969 spin-off series, Music Music Music, in which the minstrels appeared without their blackface make-up following accusations of racism against the show.

Boulter appeared as the male lead, "Freddie Flowerdew", in the musical production of Ask Dad in the Jeeves and Wooster episode, "Introduction on Broadway".

In 1973, Boulter played Mother Goose at the Cliffs Pavilion's panto.

== Personal life and death ==
In 1954, Boulter married the opera singer Lorna S. Clair. They had four children; Jason, Aidan, Philippa and Francesca. He later married the West End musical star Anna Dawson. The couple retired to New Zealand. His daughters, Philippa ("Phil") and Francesca ("Frankie"), were both singers and members of the synthpop group DATA.

Boulter died on 1 December 2025 at the age of 94.

== Recordings ==
=== As featured performer with the George Mitchell Minstrels ===
- On Stage With The George Mitchell Minstrels (1962)
- Here Come The Minstrels (1966)
- Those Magnificent Minstrels (1969)

=== Solo ===
- John Boulter Sings (1965)
- The World's Great Love Songs (1968)
- Abide With Me (1969)
- John Boulter Sings The Words That Tell Of Life And Love (1976)
- On Wings Of Song (1977)
