= Savoy Theatre =

West End theatre in London

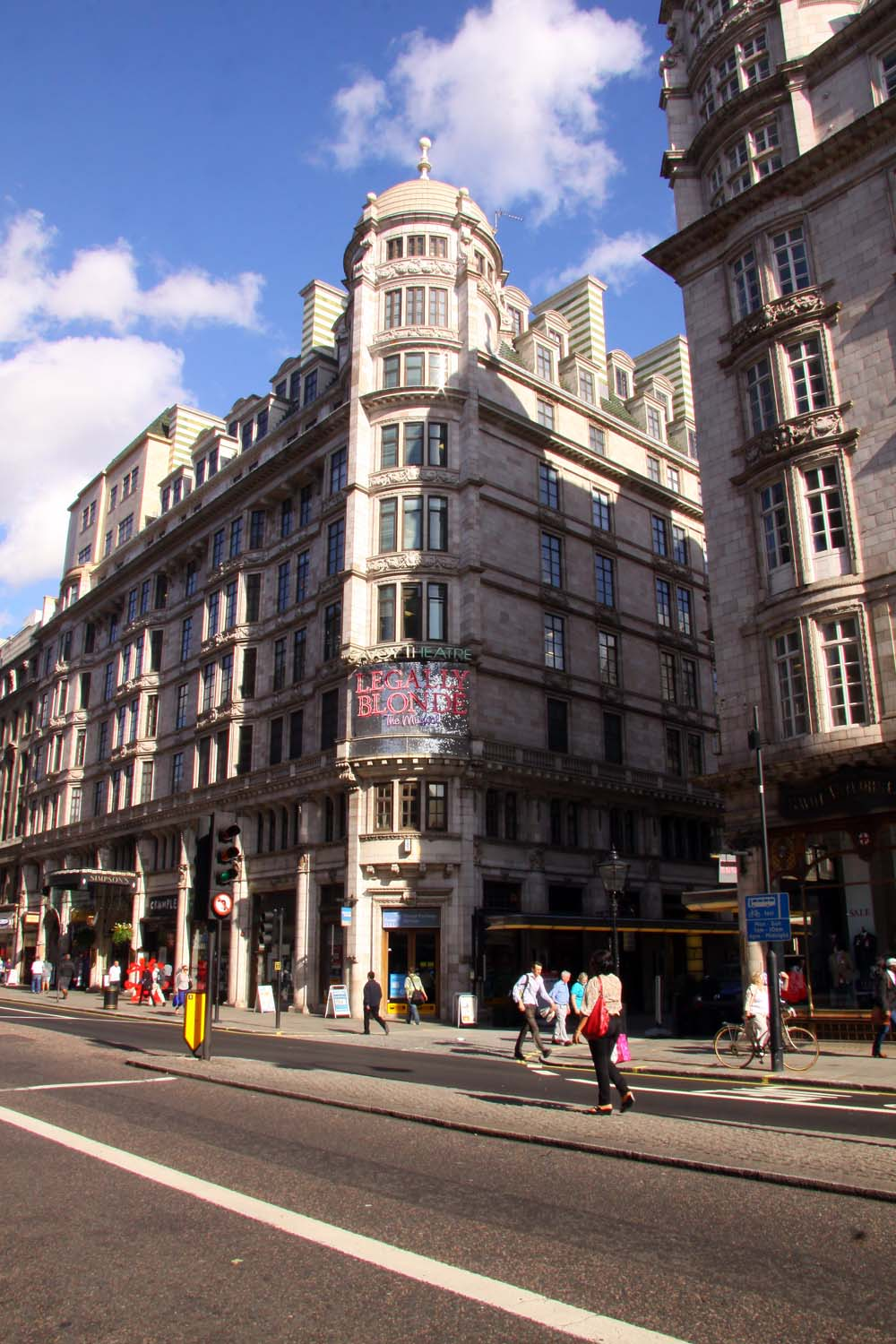
- Savoy Theatre on the Strand

- Location within Central London
- Address: Savoy Court, Strand; London, WC2
- Coordinates: 51.5101°N 0.1209°W
- Owner: ATG Entertainment
- Operator: ATG Entertainment
- Capacity: c. 1,150 on 3 levels
- Type: West End theatre
- Production: Paddington: The Musical
- Public transit: Charing Cross; Embankment; Charing Cross

Construction
- Opened: 10 October 1881; 145 years ago
- Rebuilt: 1929 (Frank A. Tugwell); 1993 (William Whitfield)
- Architect: C. J. Phipps

Website
- www.thesavoytheatre.com

The Savoy Theatre is a West End theatre in the Strand in the City of Westminster, London, England. The theatre was designed by C. J. Phipps for Richard D'Oyly Carte and opened on 10 October 1881 on a site previously occupied by the Savoy Palace. Its intended purpose was to showcase the popular series of comic operas of Gilbert and Sullivan, which became known as the Savoy operas.

The theatre was the first public building in the world to be lit entirely by electricity. For many years, the Savoy Theatre was the home of the D'Oyly Carte Opera Company, which continued to be run by the Carte family for over a century. Richard's son Rupert D'Oyly Carte rebuilt and modernised the theatre in 1929, and it was rebuilt again in 1993 following a fire. It is a Grade II* listed building.

In addition to The Mikado and other famous Gilbert and Sullivan premières, the theatre has hosted such premières as the first public performance in England of Oscar Wilde's Salome (1931) and Noël Coward's Blithe Spirit (1941). In recent years it has presented opera, Shakespeare and other non-musical plays, and musicals.

== History of the site ==
The House of Savoy was the ruling family of Savoy descended from Humbert I, Count of Sabaudia (or "Maurienne"), who became count in 1032. The name Sabaudia evolved into "Savoy" (or "Savoie"). Count Peter (or Piers or Piero) of Savoy (d. 1268) was the maternal uncle of Eleanor of Provence, queen-consort of Henry III of England, and came with her to London.

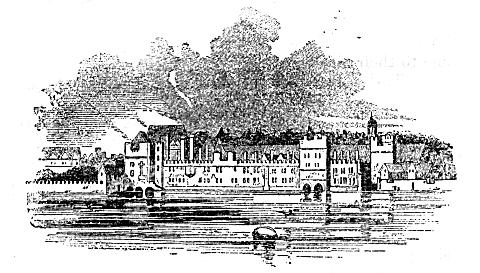
The Savoy Palace, as it appeared in the 14th century (19th c. engraving)

King Henry made Peter Earl of Richmond and, in 1246, gave him the land between The Strand and the Thames where Peter built the Savoy Palace in 1263. On Peter's death, the Savoy was given to Edmund, 1st Earl of Lancaster, by his mother, Queen Eleanor. Edmund's great-granddaughter, Blanche, inherited the site. Her husband, John of Gaunt, 1st Duke of Lancaster, built a magnificent palace that was burned down by Wat Tyler's followers in the Peasants' Revolt of 1381. King Richard II was still a child, and his uncle John of Gaunt was the power behind the throne and so a main target of the rebels.

In about 1505 Henry VII planned a great hospital for "pouer, nedie people", leaving money and instructions for it in his will. The hospital was built in the palace ruins and was licensed in 1512. Drawings show that it was a magnificent building, with a dormitory, dining hall and three chapels. Henry VII's hospital lasted for two centuries but suffered from poor management. The sixteenth-century historian John Stow noted that the hospital was being misused by "loiterers, vagabonds and strumpets". In 1702 the hospital was dissolved, and the hospital buildings were used for other purposes. Part of the old palace was used for a military prison in the eighteenth century. In the nineteenth century, the old hospital buildings were demolished and new buildings erected.

In 1864 a fire burned everything except the stone walls and the Savoy Chapel, and the property sat empty until Richard D'Oyly Carte bought it in 1880 to build the Savoy Theatre specifically for the production of the Gilbert and Sullivan operas that he was producing. The new theatre was built speedily, and accounts noted that it "was situated on a site which, though rich in historical associations, was also rich in the olfactory sense, Mr Rimmel's scent factory being close by as was Burgess's Noted Fish-Sauce Shop."

== Richard D'Oyly Carte's theatre ==
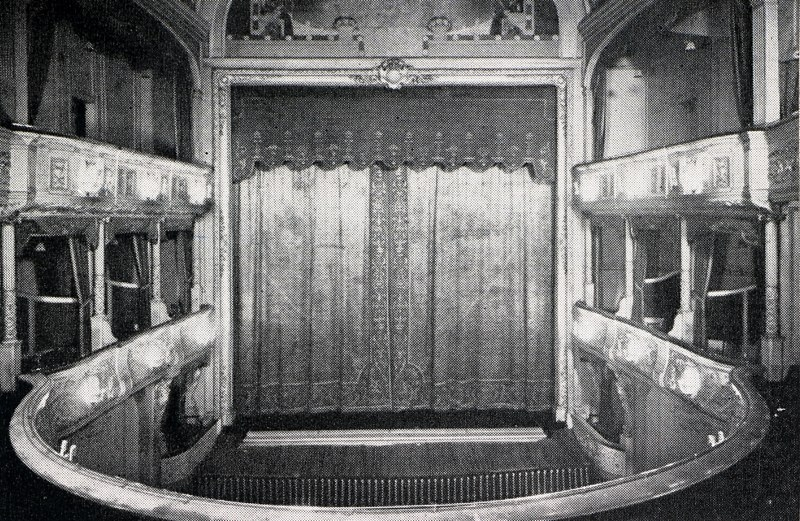
Original interior of Savoy Theatre, 1881

Carte bought the freehold of the site, then known as "Beaufort Buildings", early in 1880 for £11,000, but had begun planning his theatre several years before. In 1877 he engaged Walter Emden, an architect whose work includes the Garrick and the Duke of York's theatres. Before completing the site purchase, city officials had assured Carte that they would open a new street on the south side of the plot, provided he paid half the cost. He paid his half in March 1880, but the officials caused lengthy delays. Carte told The Times, "I am struggling in the meshes of red tape". He finally received the necessary agreement in June. At the same time he ran into another obstacle: Emden suddenly revised his estimate of building costs upward from £12,000 to £18,000. Carte dismissed Emden, who successfully sued for £1,790 for services to date and £3,000 for wrongful dismissal.

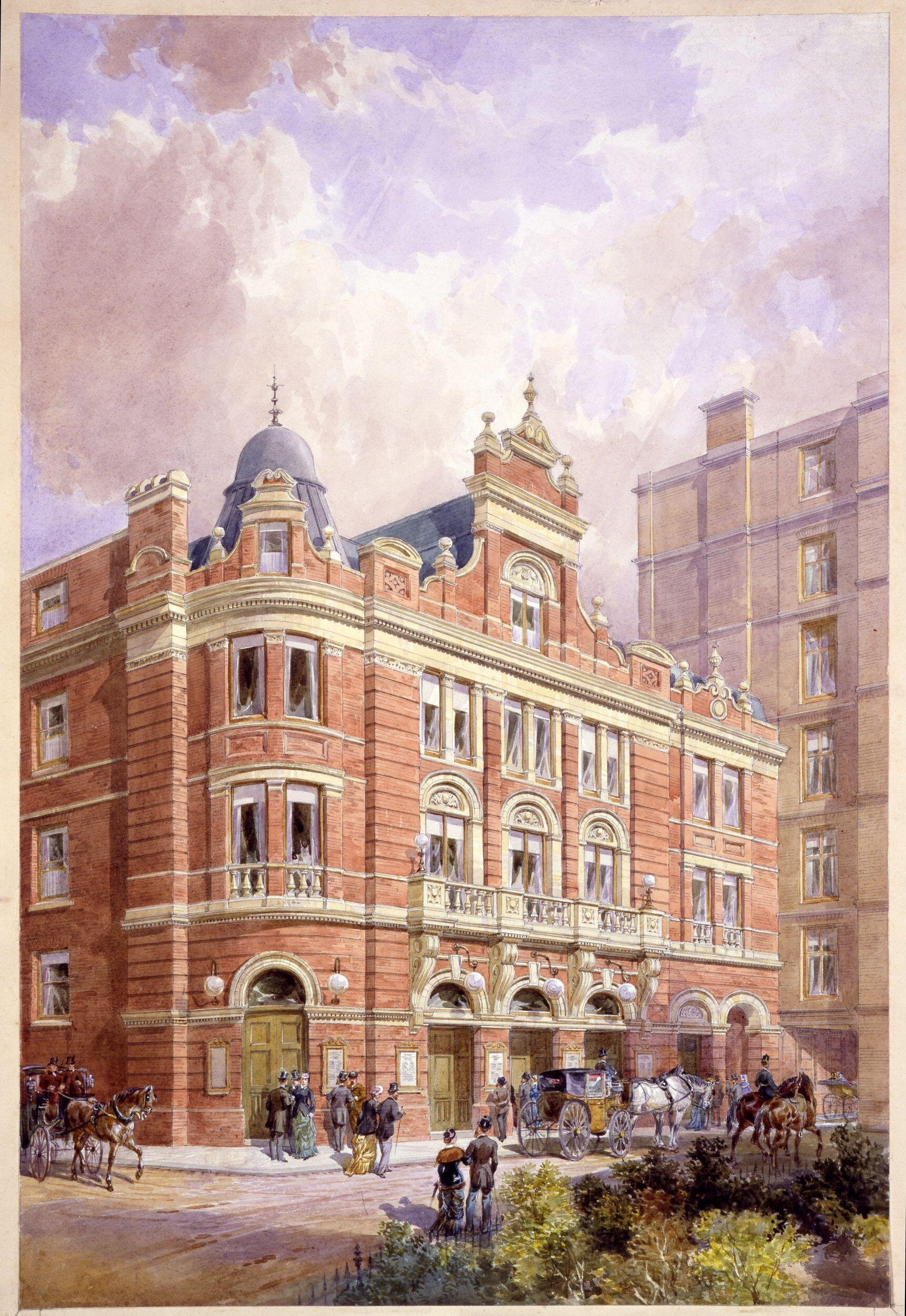
Original façade of the Savoy Theatre, 1881

Design of the theatre was given to C. J. Phipps. The builders were Patman and Fotheringham. Plans were drawn up and executed with speed and efficiency. Nonetheless, the advertised opening date had to be put back several times while the innovative electrical work was completed. The Savoy finally opened on 10 October 1881. Carte had at one time intended to call it the Beaufort Theatre, but he announced in a letter to The Daily Telegraph in 1881, "On the Savoy Manor there was formerly a theatre. I have used the ancient name as an appropriate title for the present one." The exterior of the building was made from red brick and Portland stone. The interior decoration, by Collinson and Locke, was "in the manner of the Italian Renaissance", with white, pale yellow and gold predominating, including a gold satin curtain (instead of the usual printed act-drop), red boxes and dark blue seats. There were none of the cherubs, deities and mythical creatures familiar from the décor of rival theatres. Carte wanted nothing that would appear too garish or gaudy to his target, middle-class audience.

On the opening night Phipps took curtain calls along with Gilbert, Sullivan and Carte. The Times commented, "A perfect view of the stage can be had from every seat in the house." Exits on all four sides of the theatre were provided, and fireproof materials were used to ensure maximum safety. There were three tiers with four levels: stalls and pit, balcony, circle, and amphitheatre and gallery at the top. The total seating capacity was 1,292. The proscenium arch was 30 feet (9.1 m) high by 30 feet (9.1 m) wide, and the stage was 27 feet (8.2 m) deep from the proscenium to the back wall. The theatre originally had its main entrance on the Embankment. The parcel on which it was built is steep, stretching from the Strand down to the Embankment along Beaufort Street. After Carte built the Savoy Hotel in 1889, the theatre entrance was moved to its present location at the hotel's courtyard off the Strand.

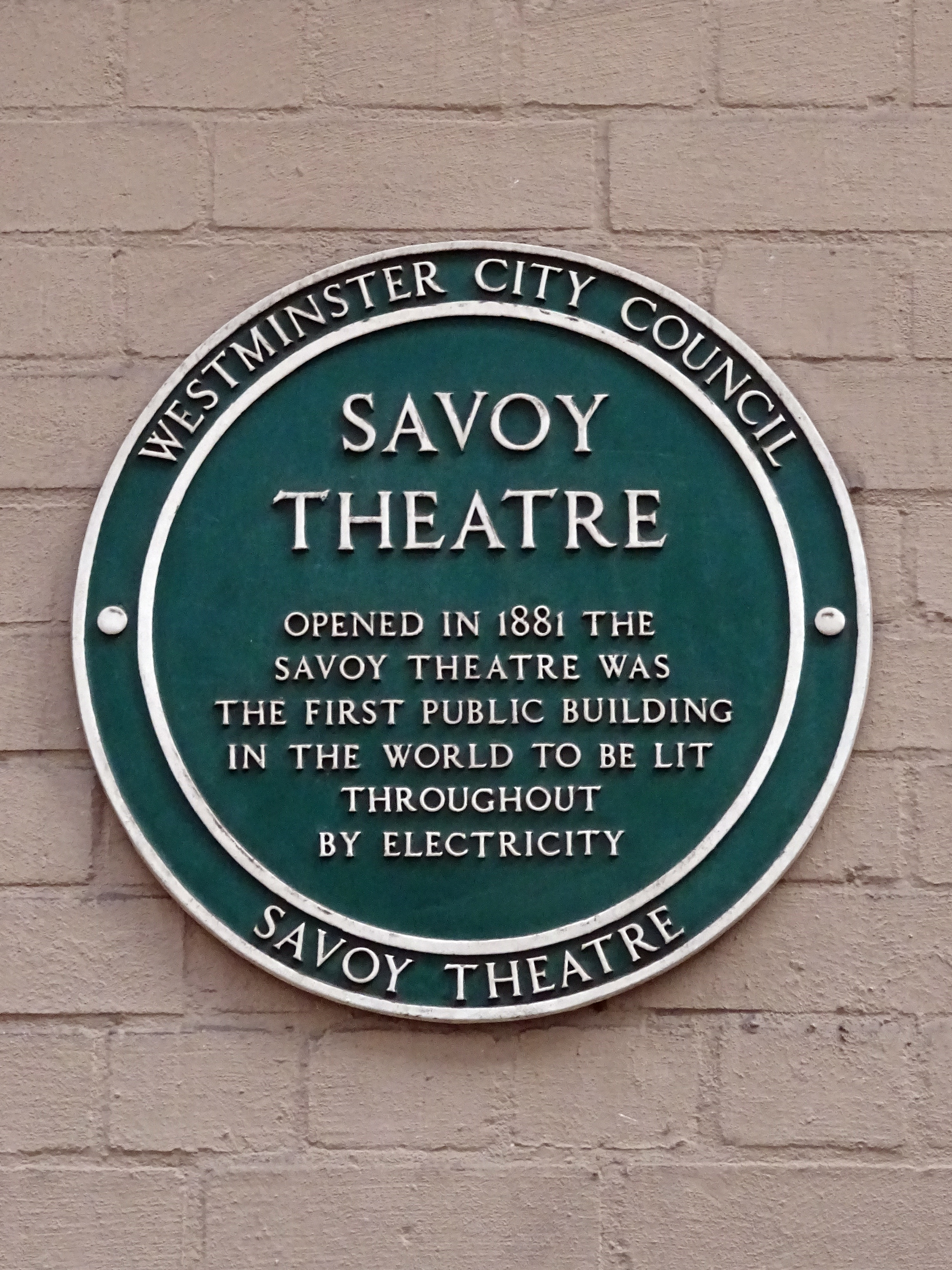
Plaque noting the Savoy as the first public building to be lit entirely by electricity

The Savoy was a state-of-the-art theatre and the first public building in the world to be lit entirely by electricity. In 1881, Sir Joseph Swan, inventor of the incandescent light bulb, supplied about 1,200 Swan incandescent lamps, and the lights were powered by a 120-horsepower (89 kW) generator on open land near the theatre. Carte explained why he had introduced electric light: "The greatest drawbacks to the enjoyment of the theatrical performances are, undoubtedly, the foul air and heat which pervade all theatres. As everyone knows, each gas-burner consumes as much oxygen as many people, and causes great heat beside. The incandescent lamps consume no oxygen, and cause no perceptible heat." The first generator proved too small to power the whole building, and though the entire front-of-house was electrically lit, the stage was lit by gas until 28 December 1881. At that performance, Carte stepped onstage and broke a glowing lightbulb before the audience to demonstrate the safety of the new technology. The Times described the electric lighting as superior, visually, to gaslight. Gaslights were installed as a backup, but they rarely had to be used. The Times concluded that the theatre "is admirably adapted for its purpose, its acoustic qualities are excellent, and all reasonable demands of comfort and taste are complied with." Carte and his manager, George Edwardes (later famous as manager of the Gaiety Theatre), introduced several innovations including numbered seating, free programme booklets, good quality whisky in the bars, the "queue" system for the pit and gallery (an American idea) and a policy of no tipping for cloakroom or other services. Daily expenses at the theatre were about half the possible takings from ticket sales.

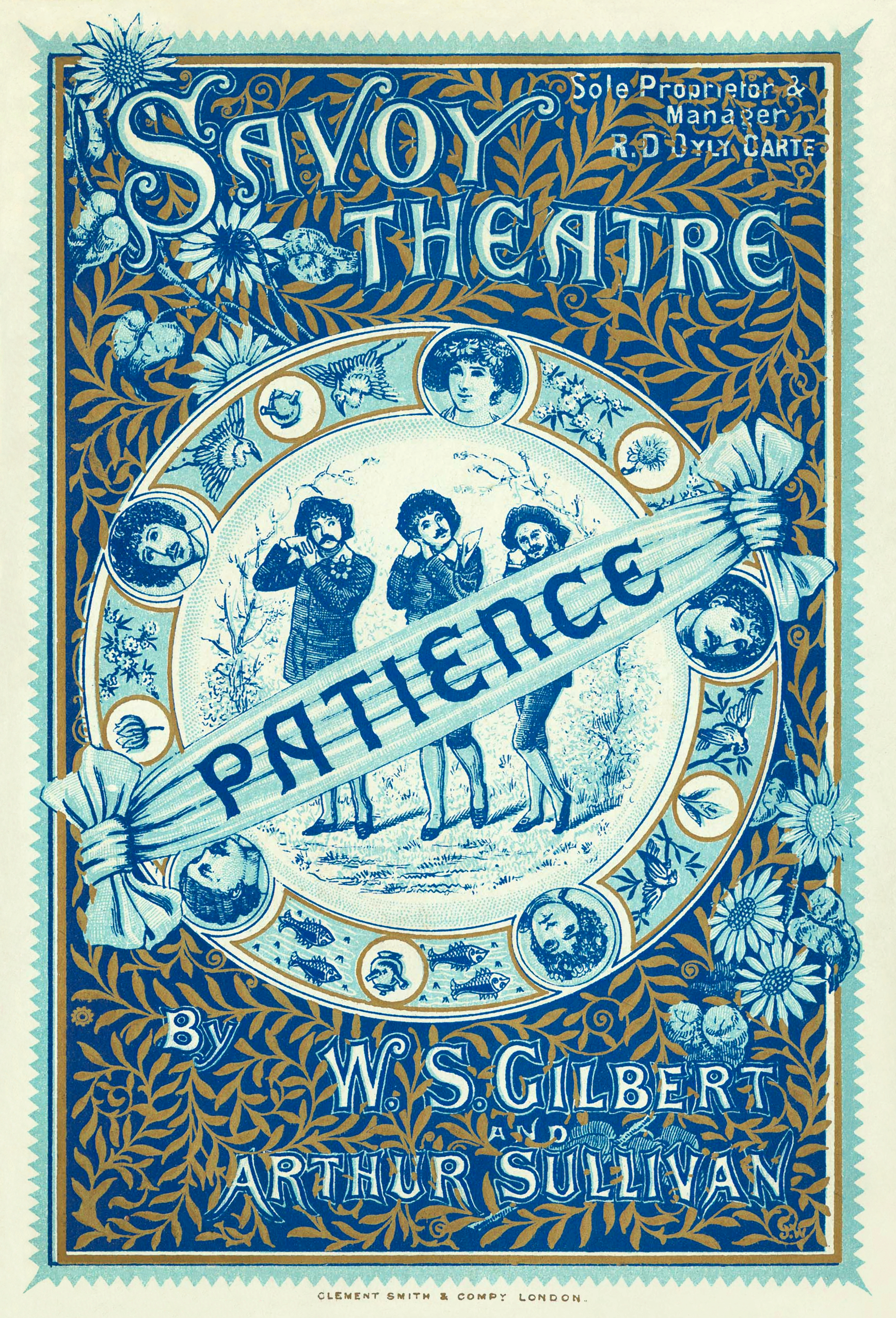
1881 Programme for Patience

The work that opened the new theatre was Gilbert and Sullivan's comic opera Patience, which had been running since April 1881 at the smaller Opera Comique. The last eight of Gilbert and Sullivan's comic operas were premièred at the Savoy: Iolanthe (1882), Princess Ida (1884), The Mikado (1885), Ruddigore (1887), The Yeomen of the Guard (1888) The Gondoliers (1889), Utopia, Limited (1893), and The Grand Duke (1896), and the term Savoy opera has come to be associated with all their joint works. After the end of the Gilbert and Sullivan partnership, Carte, and later his widow, Helen (and from 1901 to 1903, William Greet, lessee of the theatre), staged other comic operas at the theatre by Arthur Sullivan and others, notably Ivan Caryll, Sydney Grundy, Basil Hood and Edward German. The Savoy Operas of the 1890s, however, were far less successful than those of the Gilbert and Sullivan heyday. After Carte's production of The Chieftain ended in March 1895, the Theatre briefly hosted the Carl Rosa Opera Company and then closed until late 1895, when Carte resumed productions at the theatre. Sullivan died in 1900, and Richard D'Oyly Carte died in 1901.

The Savoy Theatre closed in 1903, and was reopened under the management of John Leigh and Edward Laurillard from February 1904 (beginning with a musical, The Love Birds) to December 1906. The D'Oyly Carte Opera Company returned to the Savoy for repertory seasons between 1906 and 1909, in which year C. H. Workman took over the management of the theatre. He produced, among other works, Gilbert's final opera, with music by German, Fallen Fairies in 1909–10, which ran for only 51 performances. He also produced Two Merry Monarchs and Orpheus and Eurydice in 1910, the latter of which starred Marie Brema and Viola Tree in the title roles. The D'Oyly Carte Opera Company did not play in the theatre from 1909 until 1929, instead touring throughout Britain and playing London seasons in other theatres; other works held the stage of the Savoy. George Augustus Richardson managed the theatre from November 1911 to February 1915. The Mikado's record as the Savoy's longest-running production was broken by the comedy Paddy the Next Best Thing by Gertrude Page, which played for 867 performances from April 1920.

== Rupert D'Oyly Carte's theatre ==
In 1915 Richard D'Oyly Carte's son, Rupert D'Oyly Carte, took over management of the theatre. After serving in the navy in World War I, Carte decided to bring the D'Oyly Carte Opera Company back to London in first-rate style. He began to mount seasons of updated and refreshed Gilbert and Sullivan productions at first at the Prince's Theatre in 1919. J. B. Fagan's adaptation of Treasure Island first played in December 1922 at the Savoy Theatre with Arthur Bourchier as Long John Silver. It was so popular that it was revived every Christmas until the outbreak of World War II.

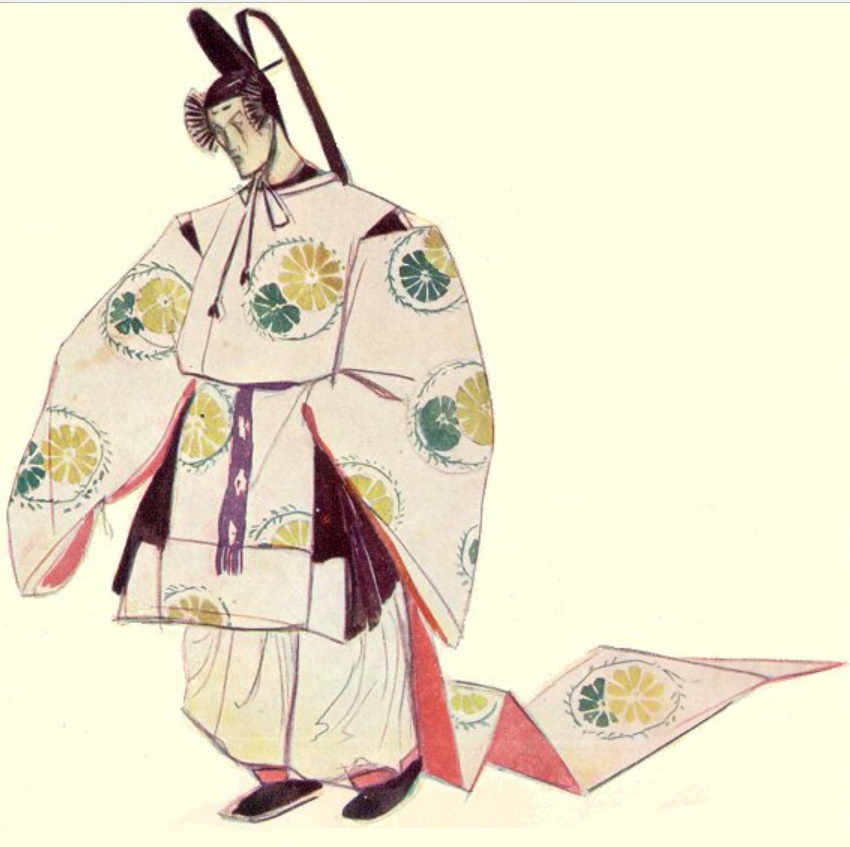
1926 costume for The Mikado

On 3 June 1929 Carte closed the Savoy Theatre, and the interior was completely rebuilt to designs by Frank A. Tugwell with elaborate décor by Basil Ionides. The ceiling was painted to resemble an April sky; the walls, translucent gold on silver; the rows of stalls were all richly upholstered in different colours, and the curtain repeated the tones of the seating. Ionides said that he took the colour scheme from a bed of zinnias in Hyde Park. The entire floor space had been replanned: the old cloakrooms and bar at the back of the theatre were relocated to the side, and instead of 18 boxes there was now only one. The new auditorium had two tiers leaving three levels: stalls, dress, and upper circle. The capacity of the old house, originally 1,292, had been reduced to 986 by 1912, and the new theatre restored the capacity almost completely, with 1,200 seats. The new stage was 29.3 feet wide, by 29.5 feet deep.

The theatre reopened on 21 October 1929 with a new production of The Gondoliers designed by Charles Ricketts and conducted by Malcolm Sargent. In the only box sat Lady Gilbert, the librettist's widow. There were Gilbert and Sullivan seasons at the Savoy Theatre in 1929–30, 1932–33, 1951, 1954, 1961–62, 1975, 2000, 2001, 2002 and 2003. Other famous works presented at the Savoy included Robert Morley in The Man Who Came to Dinner, and several comedies by William Douglas-Home starring, among others, Ralph Richardson, Peggy Ashcroft, and John Mills. The long-delayed first public performance in England of Oscar Wilde's Salome played at the theatre in 1931. In 1951 Noël Coward's Relative Values premièred at the theatre and ran for 477 performances.

After Rupert D'Oyly Carte died in 1948 his daughter, Bridget D'Oyly Carte, succeeded to the D'Oyly Carte Opera Company and became a director and later president of the Savoy Hotel group, which controlled the theatre. Management of the theatre was assumed in 1948 by Sir Hugh Wontner, chairman of the Savoy hotel group. The theatre was designated a Grade II* listed building in 1973. The D'Oyly Carte Opera Company closed in 1982, and Dame Bridget died childless in 1985, bringing the family line to an end. Wontner continued as chairman of the theatre until his death in 1992.

== 1990 fire and restored theatre ==
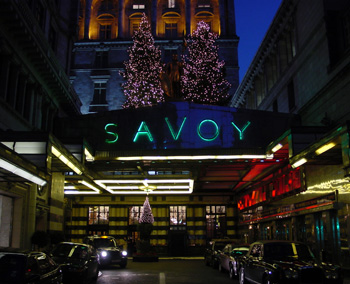
The Savoy Theatre and hotel entrance in 2003

While the theatre was being renovated, a fire gutted the building on 12 February 1990, except for the stage and backstage areas. A proposal to build a new theatre in late 20th-century style was overruled by the Savoy's insurers and English Heritage, and it was announced the day after the fire that it would be faithfully rebuilt to the 1929 design. A few of Tugwell's and Ionides's drawings survived, assisting the restoration of the theatre under the direction of the architect Sir William Whitfield, Wontner and the theatre's manager, Kevin Chapple. Some plasterwork was recreated from the fire debris and old photographs. The Savoy reopened on 19 July 1993 with a royal gala that included a specially commissioned ballet, Savoy Suite by choreographer Wayne Sleep, to a score arranged by Carl Davis based on Sullivan's music. The present theatre has a capacity of 1,158. During the renovation, an extra storey was added above the theatre that includes a health club for the hotel and a swimming pool above the stage. The reopened theatre was the venue for the World Chess Championship in 1993, won by Garry Kasparov.

In 1993 Coward's Relative Values was revived. Tom Stoppard's Travesties, with Antony Sher was next, and from 1994 to 1995 the musical She Loves Me played, with Ruthie Henshall and John Gordon Sinclair. These were followed by Terry Johnson's Dead Funny; Alan Ayckbourn's Communicating Doors (which transferred to the theatre in 1996), with Angela Thorne; J. B. Priestley's When We Are Married, with Dawn French, Alison Steadman, and Leo McKern; and Ben Travers' Plunder, with Griff Rhys Jones and Kevin McNally. In 1997 a group led by Sir Stephen Waley-Cohen was given management of the theatre by The Savoy Group. Productions that followed included Simon Callow in The Importance of Being Oscar; Pet Shop Boys in concert; Ian Richardson in Pinero's The Magistrate; Edward Fox in A Letter of Resignation; the Royal Shakespeare Company's production of Richard III, with Robert Lindsay; and Coward's Hay Fever, with Geraldine McEwan in 1999.

In 2000 the briefly reconstituted D'Oyly Carte Opera Company produced H.M.S. Pinafore at the theatre. Donald Sutherland next starred at the theatre in Enigmatic Variations, followed by a further D'Oyly Carte season, playing The Mikado and The Pirates of Penzance. In 2002, a season of Return to the Forbidden Planet was followed by the D'Oyly Carte productions of Iolanthe, The Yeomen of the Guard and The Mikado, and then a revival of Yasmina Reza's Life x 3. In 2003, the company revived Pinafore, followed by Bea Arthur at The Savoy, John Steinbeck's Of Mice and Men, Peter Pan and Pirates. These were followed by The Marriage of Figaro and The Barber of Seville performed by The Savoy Opera Company in 2004. Next were seasons of Lorna Luft starring in Songs My Mother Taught Me and the new salsa musical Murderous Instincts. Coward's Blithe Spirit was revived in 2004–05.

The Savoy Hotel group, including the theatre, was sold in 2004 to Quinlan Private which, in turn, sold the theatre in 2005 to the Ambassador Theatre Group (ATG) and the Tulbart Group (selling the Savoy Hotel to Prince Al-Waleed bin Talal). Productions since then have been mostly revivals and transfers of modern musicals; major productions have included The Rat Pack: Live from Las Vegas and a new musical theatre version of Porgy and Bess, directed by Trevor Nunn (both in 2006), Fiddler on the Roof (2007–08), Carousel (2008–09), Legally Blonde (2010–12) and Let It Be (2013–14).

In December 2013, ATG acquired sole ownership of the Savoy. The first new production after this was Dirty Rotten Scoundrels (2014–15), followed by Gypsy (2015), Funny Girl (2016), Dreamgirls (2016–19), and 9 to 5: The Musical (2019–March 2020), when UK theatres closed due to the COVID-19 pandemic.

The theatre reopened in July 2021 with Pretty Woman: The Musical, which had been playing at the Piccadilly Theatre before the closure. The production closed in June 2023. Sunset Boulevard starring Nicole Scherzinger played a limited 16-week run from September 2023 to January 2024. The Broadway transfer of Plaza Suite, starring Sarah Jessica Parker and Matthew Broderick, had a limited run from January to April 2024.

The West End premiere of Mean Girls began previews on 5 June 2024 with an opening night on 26 June. The show closed on 8 June 2025, and Burlesque played from 10 July until 6 September 2025. Paddington: The Musical premiered at the theatre on 1 November 2025.
