= Dai Francis (singer) =

Welsh singer (1928–2003)

Dai Francis (23 February 1928 – 27 November 2003) was a Welsh singer, best known for his performances with the Black and White Minstrels.

Francis was born in Glynneath, Glamorgan, the son of a music hall entertainer. Dai himself began performing at the age of ten, "blacking up" to sing Dixieland-style numbers. He left school at fourteen to work for the National Coal Board.

During National Service with the RAF in 1946-49, where he served alongside Barry Took, Francis played in a forces band. He later began touring as an entertainer and married fellow performer Elsie Monks in 1952. They had one daughter. In 1954, Francis joined the George Mitchell Singers, and was one of the first soloists to appear in The Black and White Minstrel Show when it made its television debut in 1958. Francis generally appeared at the beginning of the show to announce, "It's the Black and White Minstrel Show", in character as Al Jolson. Together with Tony Mercer and John Boulter, he fronted the troupe in most of the shows until it was taken off the air in 1978. He also appeared in most of their stage shows.

He died 27 November 2003 in Sussex aged 75.
