= Chris Clark (writer) =

British writer (born 1945/46)

- Born: 1945 or 1946
- Occupations: Crime writer, documentary maker, retired Norfolk Police intelligence officer

Chris Clark (born 1945/6) is a British amateur crime writer who writes chiefly about serial killers and their supposed links to unsolved crimes. He is a retired police intelligence officer who worked in the King's Lynn area for Norfolk Police, although his career was somewhat unsuccessful and he had three applications to join the new National Criminal Intelligence Service rejected in 1993, with the commanding officers unimpressed by his record and applications. In 2022, his book Yorkshire Ripper: The Secret Murders, which was jointly written with investigative journalist Tim Tate and alleged links between Peter Sutcliffe and unsolved murders, was made into an ITV prime-time documentary series of the same name.

As well as Sutcliffe, Clark has also written about Angus Sinclair, Christopher Halliwell and Robert Black, styling himself as the Armchair Detective. Although his work has led to police re-investigations of some cases and has featured heavily in the press, none of his theories have been proven correct. Many of his theories, meanwhile, have been discredited or definitively disproven.

== Background ==
Clark was born in 1945/6 and was schooled across England and Singapore. He originally worked as a gardener in Norfolk, tending gardens on behalf of The Queen, but grew dissatisfied with this work and changed career to working for Norfolk Constabulary. He worked as an intelligence officer for Norfolk Police between 1987 and 1994, examining the patterns of criminality in the small area surrounding King's Lynn while trying to learn and apply the new science of crime pattern analysis. His career was, however, not particularly successful, and in 1993 he had three applications to join the newly formed National Criminal Intelligence Service in London rejected, with the commanding officers unimpressed with his record and applications. Consequently, Clark's wife left him and he gave up his role in the police, retiring in 1994. In 2002 he met his second wife who subsequently told him that she had survived an attempted abduction in a small village in Cambridgeshire in 1971. With this reigniting his interest in what he saw as the unfinished business of intelligence work, he decided that this attack must have been the work of the infamous serial killer Robert Black. Clark states that learning about this event led to his writing about unsolved crimes, styling himself as the "Armchair Detective". He has said that the cliché of retired police officers investigating cases such as "the original Jack the Ripper crimes and the conspiracies surrounding 9/11" is something he is happy to adopt.

== Books and documentaries ==
When he was looking into his wife's supposed abduction by Robert Black in 1971, Clark found a number of unsolved murders which "reminded him" of the 'Yorkshire Ripper', Peter Sutcliffe. Subsequently, in 2015, Clark published a book with investigative journalist Tim Tate titled Yorkshire Ripper: The Secret Murders, which alleged that, between 1966 and 1980, Sutcliffe was responsible for numerous unsolved attacks and at least 22 more murders than he was convicted of. Due to the popularity of the book it was in 2022 turned into a two-part prime-time ITV documentary series of the same name, which featured both Clark and Tate. Clark and Tate claimed there were links between Sutcliffe and unsolved murders across the country, such as that of Jacqueline Ansell-Lamb and Barbara Mayo, Judith Roberts, Wendy Sewell, Eve Stratford and Lynne Weedon, Elizabeth Parravincina, Carol Wilkinson, Lynda Farrow and Patsy Morris. As part of the research for the book, Clark and Tate claimed to have found evidence that pointed to the wrong man having been convicted for the Sewell murder, having unearthed a pathology report which allegedly indicated that the originally convicted Stephen Downing could not have committed the crime. The Home Office responded by stating that it would send any new evidence to the police. Derbyshire Police dismissed the theory, pointing to the fact that a reinvestigation in 2002 had found that only Stephen Downing couldn't be ruled out of the investigation, and responded by stating that there was no evidence linking Sutcliffe to the crime.

In 2017, Clark co-wrote a book on Robert Black with author Robert Giles, titled The Face of Evil: The True Story of the Serial Killer Robert Black. It claimed that Black could be linked to a number of unsolved disappearances and murders across Britain and Europe, such as the Genette Tate, Mary Boyle and April Fabb cases.

In 2021, he published two other books on crimes linked to Angus Sinclair and Christopher Halliwell with podcast authors Adam Lloyd and Bethan Trueman. Clark's investigations and claims that Halliwell could be responsible for the 1994 murder of Julie Finley near Liverpool contributed to the establishment of a formal reinvestigation of the murder and of Halliwell's potential links to the case.

Clark is also a television consultant for other crime television documentaries. He and his theories continue to make regular appearances in the press.

== Discredited theories ==
A number of Clark's theories have been dismissed by police or have been subsequently disproven. Some links suggested in Clark's books were also previously investigated and discounted by police before the books were published.

=== The New Millennium Serial Killer ===
In The New Millennium Serial Killer, Clark claimed that Halliwell was responsible for the 2002 murder of Rachel Wilson in Middlesbrough. However, in November 2021 Keith Hall was jailed for the murder after pleading guilty, and Clark was forced to admit that Halliwell had not committed the attack. Clark and his investigative partner Tim Hicks had previously been reprimanded by Cleveland Police for claiming in the North Yorks Enquirer and in the Daily Star that Halliwell, and not this man, was responsible, with the latter article being ordered to be removed as it was prejudicial to the inquiry (the suspect was still under investigation at the time). Clark had previously claimed that Wilson's murder was one of three similar killings committed in the area by Halliwell alongside Donna Keogh in 1998 and Vicky Glass in 2000. After the individual was convicted of Wilson's murder in 2021 he claimed that Halliwell was still responsible for the other two murders. One person police believe may have killed Glass is Steve Wright, and two months after he was arrested for the 1999 murder of Vicky Hall in 2021 police announced they were investigating "new lines of inquiry" in the Glass case.

In the same month as the conviction in the Wilson case three unrelated individuals were charged with the murder of Caroline Glachan, another case Clark had claimed was committed by Halliwell. Police have firmly ruled out any connection between Halliwell and the murder of Melanie Hall, another case Clark claimed to have been committed by Halliwell, and in 2019 detectives had already announced they had DNA evidence in the case. Detectives are also already known to have DNA evidence in two other cases Clark alleged were linked to Halliwell: the "Bath Rapist" case and the murder of Lindsay Rimer.

North Yorkshire Police also insist that there is no evidence linking Halliwell to the disappearance of Claudia Lawrence, with Wiltshire Police pointing out that they have CCTV evidence of Halliwell in Swindon on the night she disappeared in York (over 200 miles driving distance away). They also pointed out that Halliwell would have no reason to be in Yorkshire, with his only relative in the area (some distance away in Huddersfield) having died several years before the disappearance.

Clark alleged in the book that Halliwell could have killed Linda Razzell, a woman who disappeared from Swindon in 2002. However, her husband Glynn Razzell was convicted of the murder and his appeals against his conviction have failed. Linda's family say they have no doubt over his guilt and they have dismissed the idea that Halliwell could have committed the murder. In 2018 highly regarded miscarriage of justice organisation Inside Justice investigated the Razzell case as part of a BBC documentary, Conviction, but in fact concluded that the conviction was safe and concluded there was no evidence linking Halliwell to the crime other than rumour.

=== Yorkshire Ripper: The Secret Murders ===
A number of murders Clark and Tate claimed could be linked to Sutcliffe in their book Yorkshire Ripper: The Secret Murders already have DNA evidence, such as the murders of Barbara Mayo, Eve Stratford, Lynne Weedon and Lynda Farrow, and investigators are known to already have a copy of Sutcliffe's DNA and have been able to rule him out of unsolved cases as a result, such as in the Lesley Molseed case. Barbara Mayo was already ruled out as a Peter Sutcliffe victim by police in 1997, and the DNA sample in her murder case has not been linked by police to that of Weedon, Stratford or Farrow, showing the murders were committed by different people. This also likely means that the killer of Jacqueline Ansell-Lamb could not be the same as that of Weedon, Stratford or Farrow, since police strongly believe the same man killed Mayo and Ansell-Lamb. The DNA in Farrow's case also does not match that in any other case, showing that the same person could not be responsible for her murder and that of Ansell-Lamb, Mayo, Stratford and Weedon. Since a link between Sutcliffe and the Stratford and Weedon cases can be disproven by DNA, this also discredits the theory that he was responsible for the murders of Elizabeth Parravincina and Patsy Morris, since Clark and Tate said the same person had committed all of these murders. Upon Sutcliffe's death in 2020, Clark submitted a Freedom of Information request to the Home Office, asking if Sutcliffe's DNA was on the national DNA database. The Home Office confirmed that it was, indicating that Sutcliffe can be ruled out of unsolved murder cases in which there is existing DNA evidence such as in the Mayo, Stratford, Weedon and Farrow cases. Notably, these cases did not feature in the subsequent 2022 documentary version of the book.

One murder that was linked to Sutcliffe in the book, that of Alison Morris in Ramsey, Essex on 1 September 1979, took place only 6.5 hours before his known killing of Barbara Leach in Bradford, over 200 miles away. Clark and Tate claimed that Sutcliffe could have been in Essex and that he would still have had enough time to drive back to Bradford to kill Leach 6.5 hours later.

One supposedly "unsolved" murder linked to Sutcliffe in The Secret Murders, that of Marion Spence in Leeds in 1979, had in fact already been solved in January 1980 when a man was convicted of her murder.

=== Angus Sinclair ===
Clark claimed in a front-page 2015 article in Dundee's Courier newspaper that Angus Sinclair was responsible for the infamous Templeton Woods murders in the city in 1979 and 1980. He then repeated this claim in 2017, but police subsequently revealed to him that Sinclair was imprisoned during both of the murders on firearms charges and confirmed this in a Freedom of Information request, meaning Sinclair could not have been responsible for the Templeton Woods killings and completely disproving Clark's claim. Clark was forced to admit this in his 2021 book on Sinclair. He subsequently claimed that Sinclair's brother-in-law could have been responsible instead. In 2007 a local man, Vincent Simpson, had been tried for one of the murders after a 1 in 40 million DNA match was found between his DNA and samples found on the victim's clothing, but he was found not guilty by a majority verdict at the conclusion of the trial.

== List of titles ==
- Clark, Chris; Tate, Tim (2015). Yorkshire Ripper: The Secret Murders. The True Story of how Peter Sutcliffe's Terrible Reign of Terror Claimed at Least 22 More Lives. London: John Blake. ISBN 978-1784184186.
- Giles, Robert; Clark, Chris (2017). The Face of Evil: The True Story of the Serial Killer Robert Black. London: John Blake. ISBN 9781786068415.
- Trueman, Bethan; Clark, Chris (16 February 2023). The New Millennium Serial Killer: Examining the Crimes of Christopher Halliwell. Pen and Sword True Crime. ISBN 978-1-3990-4100-3.
- Clark, Chris; Lloyd, Adam (21 September 2021). Gone Fishing: The Unsolved Crimes of Angus Sinclair. Mango Books. ISBN 978-1-914277-20-7.
