= In Denial of Murder =

- Genre: Crime drama
- Written by: Neil McKay
- Directed by: David Richards
- Starring: Stephen Tompkinson; Caroline Catz; Jason Watkins; Steve Jackson; David Troughton; June Watson; Lisa Millett; Judy Flynn; Wayne Foskett; Jennifer Hennessy
- Composer: Hal Lindes
- Country of origin: United Kingdom
- Original language: English
- No. of series: 1
- No. of episodes: 2

Production
- Executive producers: Mike Dormer; Mark Redhead
- Producer: Mary McMurray
- Cinematography: Lawrence Jones
- Editor: Catherine Creed
- Running time: 60 minutes
- Production company: Hat Trick Productions

Original release
- Network: BBC One
- Release: 29 February – 7 March 2004

In Denial of Murder is a two-part British television crime drama series, written by Neil McKay and directed by David Richards, that first broadcast on BBC One on 29 February 2004. The series follows investigative journalist Don Hale (Stephen Tompkinson) as he attempts to prove that convicted murderer Stephen Downing (Jason Watkins) was wrongly convicted for the murder of Wendy Sewell (Caroline Catz) in 1973.

The series was based upon Hale's book Town Without Pity (which was later reprinted under the title In Denial of Murder in 2014). Hale sold television rights to the book to Hat Trick productions in November 2000. The series marked the second time that Tompkinson and Catz co-starred together, having previously appeared in All Quiet on the Preston Front and later going on to star together in DCI Banks. Notably, the series has yet to be released on DVD.

== Criticism ==
Don Hale himself criticised the production, stating that "It is NOT a factual documentary and has been especially written for prime-time television. In my opinion, several crucial elements of the story have been omitted and I believe it fails to provide a wholly accurate version of events. The timeline has unfortunately been seriously amended without reason. These errors and others clearly present a false impression."

Following the series broadcast, Stephen Downing commented to the Daily Express, “I don’t know about no pity but it’s a town divided. Some people still think I did it. It is just something I have to live with. In many ways life was easier inside – you did not have to look for a job, you got money, three meals a day and a roof over your head. Since I left prison things have been hard. I don’t really have much of a life. Yes, I’m free but I am still paying for a crime I did not commit.”

== Cast ==
- Stephen Tompkinson as Don Hale
- Caroline Catz as Wendy Sewell
- Jason Watkins as Stephen Downing
- Steve Jackson as John Marshall
- David Troughton as Ray Downing
- June Watson as Nita Downing
- Lisa Millett as Christine Downing
- Judy Flynn as Kath Hale
- Wayne Foskett as David Sewell
- Jennifer Hennessy as Jackie Dunn
- Neil Boorman as Ron Duggins
- Malcolm Raeburn as Adrian Duggins
- Andrea Mason as Lesley Shooter
- Ewan Hooper as Charles Hale
- Jeanne Hepple as Doreen Hale
- Bill Rodgers as Reg Ollerenshaw
- Richard Standing as Roy Eyre
- Ruth Mitchell as Christine Smith
- Bobby Knutt as Ernie Charlesworth
- Brian Southwood as Eric Clough
- Ryan Sampson as Marcus Edwards

== Episodes ==
No. overall	No. in series	Title	Directed by	Written by	Original release date	Viewers (millions)
1	1	"Part 1"	David Richards	Neil McKay	29 February 2004	5.42
More than twenty years after the murder of Wendy Sewell, local newspaper editor Don Hale takes up the case in an attempt to prove that Stephen Downing was wrongly jailed in 1973.
2	2	"Part 2"	David Richards	Neil McKay	7 March 2004	4.85
Don's campaign faces a huge backlash from the public.
