= Andrew Evans case =

Wrongful conviction of murder

Andrew Evans
- Born: 1955 (age 70–71)
- Known for: Wrongful murder conviction

Andrew Evans (born 1955) is an English soldier from Longton, Staffordshire who was wrongfully convicted and served 25 years in jail after confessing to the 1972 murder of Judith Roberts, a 14-year-old schoolgirl from a village close to the northern outskirts of nearby Tamworth. Evans was stationed at Whittington Barracks near Lichfield – an army base in close proximity to Tamworth – when Judith was dragged from her bicycle and battered to death in June 1972. He later confessed to the crime after seeing the girl's face in a dream.

Evans was charged with Judith's murder in October 1972 after he presented himself at a local police station, asking to see a photograph of the victim, and making a signed statement following three days of interviews in which he maintained his guilt. Although he subsequently retracted his confession, a jury convicted him of murder following a trial in 1973, and he was sentenced to life imprisonment. Advised he had no grounds for appeal, Evans spent the next two decades in prison before his case came to the attention of the British media in 1994, and was taken up by the human rights group Justice when he contacted them about it.

With no other evidence against him apart from his own words, and strong evidence that he was suffering from false memories as the result of anxiety and depression at the time of his arrest, Evans's conviction was overturned by the Court of Appeal in 1997; and he was released from prison. As of 1997 the time he spent in custody was the longest period served by an individual in the United Kingdom as the result of a miscarriage of justice. Evans was awarded £750,000 in compensation from the Home Office in 2000, while the identity of the real killer remains unknown.

== Background ==
The daughter of a schoolmaster, and described as bright and academic, Judith Roberts was a 14-year-old grammar school pupil from Wigginton, near Tamworth. Following a family disagreement about wearing makeup, she left her home at around 5.30 pm on 7 June 1972 to cycle along Comberford Lane. Her body was discovered later the same day under a pile of hedge clippings and plastic fertiliser bags in a field adjacent to the road, and a subsequent post-mortem concluded she had been battered to death.

Police launched a murder investigation involving 200 detectives, who collected more than 15,400 sets of fingerprints and in excess of 11,000 statements. In addition, officers visited over 11,000 addresses as they made house-to-house inquiries, roadblocks were established in the area, and 4,200 separate pieces of evidence were followed up. However, in spite of what became one of the Midlands' most intensive hunts for a murder suspect for several years, the killer remained at large.

== Under suspicion ==
In June 1972 Andrew Evans was a 17-year-old soldier stationed at Whittington Barracks near Lichfield, Staffordshire, but having suffered an asthma attack he was awaiting discharge on medical grounds, and on 7 June, the evening Judith Roberts was killed he was a day away from handing in his uniform and returning home. A semi-literate, nervous and socially inadequate teenager, he had joined the Armed Forces in the hope of a career, and after his discharge was treated for depression, and prescribed valium for that condition.

As part of the police investigation into the murder, soldiers residing at Whittington on 7 June were required to complete a form giving an account of their whereabouts for that evening, and providing references. Evans said that he had spent that evening at the barracks, giving the names of three other soldiers who could verify his presence there. However, police subsequently failed to trace one of the named soldiers, and discovered the remaining two had left the barracks before 7 June. Evans was questioned again in October by police who visited him at his grandmother's house.

On the morning after that interview, Evans told his grandmother that he planned to visit the police station because he wished to see a picture of Judith, Evans having made this decision after having a dream in which he saw "a hazy combination of images of women's faces" which convinced him he was the killer. Although his grandmother advised him against such action, he subsequently presented himself to officers at Longton Police Station in a distressed state, where he made his request, telling them he had dreamt of Judith: "I keep seeing a face. I want to see a picture of her. I wonder if I've done it."

== Confession and trial ==
During a series of interviews with detectives, Evans claimed that he had dragged Judith from her bicycle, and then struggled with her in a field. Asked if he was the killer he answered, "This is it. I don't know. Show me a picture and I'll tell you if I've seen it." Investigators also asked him whether he'd ever visited Tamworth, to which he replied, "I don't know. I don't know. I could have been. I forget where I have been." Detectives initially did not believe his account, dismissing him as a fantasist, but over the three-day period in which Evans was questioned, they became increasingly certain he was the killer. After giving a signed statement under caution, Evans was charged with murder. Speaking in 2000 about this, Evans told The Guardian's Patrick Weir, "By confessing, I thought I'd be able to rid myself of all the crap going on in my head."

Evans's trial was held at Birmingham Crown Court in June 1973. By this time he believed that he was innocent, and had retracted his original statement. It was claimed that his confession had been made with the use of Brietal, a so-called truth drug that was later discredited for inducing false memories. Prosecution and defence lawyers both agreed the drug's use. Apart from the confession, no other evidence was presented; there was no scientific evidence against him nor any eyewitnesses to support or refute the Crown's case. However, Evans could not provide an alibi for 7 June 1972, while a psychiatrist testified that Evans was suffering from amnesia.

Evans's defence argued that he was suffering from hysterical amnesia, and had cast himself in the role of killer after witnessing the murder and failing to help Judith. However, he was convicted of Judith's murder and sentenced to life imprisonment.

== Appeal and compensation ==
After being advised he had no grounds for an appeal Evans accepted the status quo. But in 1994 his case came to the attention of the media following a chance encounter with a member of Greenpeace while Evans was an inmate at Verne Prison in Dorset. Steve Elsworth went to the prison to give a talk, and after meeting Evans, later returned to visit and interview him. While Evans relayed his story, Elsworth took detailed notes of the case, then passed them on to John McLeod and Allister Craddock, two producers at Carlton Television. The case was subsequently featured that year on Central Television's Crime Stalker, a regional magazine programme in the Midlands presented by John Stalker, and later in a 1997 documentary, The Nightmare.

Evans also wrote to the human rights organisation Justice about his case in 1994, and they agreed to take it up. Represented by their solicitor, Kate Akester, Evans won the right to appeal against his conviction. The hearing took place at the Court of Appeal of England and Wales in December 1997 before three judges; Lord Chief Justice Lord Bingham, Mr Justice Jowitt and Mr Justice Douglas Brown. Evans was represented there by Patrick O'Connor QC, while the Crown was represented by Bruce Houlder, QC.

The hearing was told that in 1972 Evans had been taking medication prescribed to him for depression, and the judges were critical of the manner in which the police inquiry was conducted. It was said that during his questioning, Evans was offered no medical assistance, despite his mental and physical condition. Police also did not offer Evans access to a solicitor, and often failed to caution him as procedure required. O'Connor said that Evans's confession would not have been given had a doctor or solicitor been present because he would have been diagnosed as unfit to be interviewed.

On the question of the content of his statement, Lord Bingham said, "In this he clearly implicated himself as the murderer. Many of the details in this statement accorded with the facts as then known or later established, but some did not." The judges held that psychiatric testimony at the original trial was unreliable, and a doctor told the appeal Evans had suffered "false memory" as a result of the extreme anxiety and hysterical state he was in at the time. Because of his state of mind, the confession would not have been admissible under the law as it stood in 1997. The Court also heard that none of Judith's blood had been found on Evans, and a fingerprint on her bike did not belong to him. The Court consequently quashed Evans's conviction after deeming it to be unsafe, and he was released from custody with immediate effect. At the time of his release the twenty-five years Evans had spent in prison was the longest period served by an individual in the United Kingdom as the result of a miscarriage of justice, though in 2001 it would be surpassed by the twenty-seven years served by Stephen Downing following his wrongful conviction of the murder of Wendy Sewell, and then again by Peter Sullivan, who served thirty-eight years for the murder of Diane Sindall.

Following the appeal Staffordshire Police said that they had no plans to reopen their investigation into the murder of Judith Roberts, as all lines of inquiry had been exhausted at the time. A spokesman also stated that investigators had followed correct procedure, "and there was never any question of misconduct by any of those officers".

Evans sought compensation from the Home Office for his wrongful conviction, and in 2000 was awarded £750,000. Together with other payments he received from them, his solicitor estimated the total amount of his compensation was around £1million. The sum was the largest award made in the United Kingdom to a person who has suffered a miscarriage of justice. Speaking of his compensation, Evans said, "For the past two and a half years we have been fighting for this money and at last it has been sorted. I am relieved. I will never be fully free – every time I lock a door I have flashbacks to being in prison."

In 2014, Chris Clarke, a cold case expert and former detective with Norfolk Police, suggested the murder of Judith Roberts may be one of five additional killings committed by Yorkshire Ripper Peter Sutcliffe at locations around the Midlands. Clarke cites the Roberts case alongside the 1970 murder of Barbara Mayo at Chesterfield, Derbyshire, the 1973 killing of Wendy Sewell at Bakewell, Derbyshire, and the 1974 Leicestershire murders of Rosina Hilliard and Caroline Allen as being the work of Sutcliffe, since they bear similarities to the crimes committed by him. Clarke published his claims in Yorkshire Ripper: The Secret Murders, which he co-authored with investigative journalist Tim Tate. The Sutcliffe theory has also been supported by Tamworth-based historian Sarah Clark, whose mother was a friend of the Roberts family.
