= Stephen Downing =

Steve or Stephen Downing may refer to:

- Stephen Downing (producer) (1938–2025), American screenwriter, activist and investigative journalist
- Steve Downing (born 1950), American basketball player
- Stephen Downing, English 17-year-old in 1974 convicted for Murder of Wendy Sewell
