= Chris Halliwell =

Chris Halliwell may refer to:

- Chris_Halliwell (Charmed), a supporting character in the TV series
- Christopher Halliwell (born 1990), an English murderer
