= Andrea Mason (actress) =

English actress (born 1968

- Born: 1968 (age 57–58)
- Occupation: Actress
- Years active: 1994–present
- Television: The Bill; Holby City; Doctors; In Denial of Murder; Emmerdale

Andrea Mason (born 1968) is an English actress. She is known for portraying the role of W.P.C. Debbie Keane in The Bill between 1995 and 1998. She has also made guest appearances in other television series including Clocking Off and William and Mary, as well as portraying various characters in Holby City, Doctors and Emmerdale on various occasions.

== Career ==
Mason began her acting career in 1994, and her first credited role was as Laurie Henderson in the CITV children's television series Three Seven Eleven, and later that year appeared in the television film The Whipping Boy. In 1995, she played a receptionist in an episode of in the crime drama She's Out, before joining the cast of the ITV police procedural television series The Bill as W.P.C. Debbie Keane, a role she went on to play for the next three years. Following her departure, she appeared in an episode of Holby City in 1999.

During the early 2000s, she made various guest appearances in an array of television shows and films including Eisenstein (2000), Doctors (2001), Always and Everyone (2002), and William Mary (2003), as well as making a further appearance in Holby City as Mia Goodall. In 2004, she appeared in an episode of Coronation Street, before securing the role of Lesley Shooter in the crime drama In Denial of Murder. In 2006, she appeared in episodes of Wire in the Blood and a further episode of Doctors.

In 2012, Mason returned to Doctors, and went on to appear in the medical drama on a further two occasions in 2017 and 2023, the latter of which was in the guest role of Frankie Sharp. She has also appeared in WPC 56, DCI Banks and Casualty, as well as two stints in the ITV soap opera Emmerdale. In 2019, she appeared on The Bill podcast to discuss her experiences.

== Filmography ==
Year	Title	Role	Notes
1994	Three Seven Eleven	Laurie Harrison	1 episode
1994	The Whipping Boy	Molly	Television film
1995	She's Out	Receptionist	1 episode
1995–1998	The Bill	Debbie Keane	Main role
1999	Holby City	Mia Goodall	Episode: "Never Judge a Book..."
2000	Eisenstein	Elena	Film
2001	Doctors	Carol Boyd	Episode: "Giving Up"
2002	Always and Everyone	Sarah da Costa	Episode: "The Last Will and Testament of Robert Kingsford"
2003	Holby City	Beth Waller	Episode: "Wonderland"
2003	William and Mary	Ella Patterson	1 episode
2004	Coronation Street	Jordanna James	Guest role
2004	In Denial of Murder	Lesley Shooter	Main role
2006	Wire in the Blood	Linda Ignatieff	Episode: "Time to Murder and Create"
2006	Doctors	Gina Santander	Episode: "The Man of the Family"
2012	Doctors	Sheila Foster	Episode: "Entente Cordiale"
2013	WPC 56	Gladys Campbell	Episode: "Sink or Swim"
2014, 2022	Emmerdale	Prosecution Barrister / Saskia's Barrister	Recurring role
2015	DCI Banks	Kelly	Episode: "Buried: Part 2"
2017	Doctors	Gwyneth Pearson	Episode: "Tough Love"
2022	Casualty	Ellen Dawn	Episode: "Judgement Call"
2023	Doctors	Frankie Sharp	Recurring role

== Stage ==
Year	Title	Role	Venue
1993	Volpone	Molly	Birmingham Repertory Theatre
1993	Othello	Celia	Birmingham Repertory Theatre
1994	The Hairy Ape	Aunt	Bristol Old Vic
2001	The Relapse	Abigail	Royal National Theatre
2009	Harvest	Mam / W.A.C.	Rho Delta
