= Love and Marriage (2013 TV series) =

British television series

Love and Marriage is a British comedy-drama series that was broadcast on ITV beginning on 5 June 2013. It stars Alison Steadman as Pauline Paradise, a recently retired lollipop lady, who after the death of her father Frank (David Ryall) decides to leave her family and goes to live with her sister. It was written by Stewart Harcourt. The series consisted of 6 episodes. On 19 August 2013, ITV cancelled the series.

== Cast ==
- Alison Steadman as Pauline Paradise
- Duncan Preston as Ken Paradise
- Celia Imrie as Rowan Holdaway
- Larry Lamb as Tommy Sutherland
- Stewart Wright as Kevin Paradise
- Ashley Jensen as Sarah Paradise
- Niky Wardley as Heather McCallister
- James McArdle as Charlie McCallister
- Graeme Hawley as Martin Paradise
- Zoe Telford as Michelle Paradise
- Jessica Sula as Scarlet Quilter
- David Ryall as Frank Holdaway
- George Boden as Nathan Paradise
