= Murder in Suburbia =

British television series

- Also known as: Ash and Scribbs
- Genre: Crime drama
- Written by: Nick Collins
- Starring: Caroline Catz; Lisa Faulkner; Jeremy Sheffield
- Country of origin: United Kingdom
- Original language: English
- No. of series: 2
- No. of episodes: 12 (list of episodes)

Production
- Executive producer: Sharom Bloom
- Producers: Joy Spink; Tim Whitby
- Production locations: Northwood, London, England
- Running time: 50 minutes
- Production company: Carlton Television

Original release
- Network: ITV
- Release: 13 March 2004 – 2 July 2005

Murder in Suburbia is a British television drama series first broadcast on ITV on 13 March 2004. The series focuses on the work of DS Emma Scribbins (Lisa Faulkner) and DI Kate Ashurst (Caroline Catz), police detectives assigned to the murder squad of the fictional suburban English town of Middleford. In this capacity, they are supervised by DCI Jeremy Sullivan (Jeremy Sheffield).

Filming for the series took place in Northwood and other locations in Northwest London. A second series was broadcast in 2005, but did not achieve the ratings of the first series, and the programme was subsequently axed by the network. Both series have since been released on DVD. In Japan and other regional territories, the series was renamed Ash and Scribbs.

== Critical reception ==
Rupert Smith of The Guardian said of the second series premiere; "Dramas about murdered schoolgirls aren't usually my cup of gore, but this was played so much for laughs that I could almost forgive the opening scene of a terrified child running through a graveyard before meeting her killer's blade. Thereafter it spun cheerfully along as a tale of rural witchcraft, complete with a wise priest who kept a book about demonology on his lectern; I don't know what the Synod would have to say about that. There were hex dolls, blood rituals and quite a lot of firm naked flesh on display, which made Murder in Suburbia comfortingly like an ancient Hammer movie. Caroline Catz and Lisa Faulkner remained well-dressed and wisecracking throughout."

== Cast and characters ==
=== Regular cast and characters ===
- Caroline Catz as Detective Inspector Kate Ashurst ("Ash")
- Lisa Faulkner as Detective Sergeant Emma Scribbins ("Scribbs")
- Jeremy Sheffield as Detective Chief Inspector Jeremy Sullivan

=== Recurring cast and characters ===
- Glen Davies as Police Constable Tony Gallimore
- Stuart Nurse as Doctor David Weatherall, Police Pathologist

== Episode list ==
=== Series 1 (2004) ===
| No. overall | No. in series | Title | Directed by | Written by | Original release date | UK viewers (millions) |
|---|---|---|---|---|---|---|
| 1 | 1 | "Applejacks" | Edward Bennett | Nick Collins | 13 March 2004 | 6.74 |
Ashurst and Scribbins investigate the murder of party girl Nikki Pengelly, who is found stabbed to death by her fiancé. When it is discovered that she was regular entertainment at a dating club for wealthy singles, motives begin to come to light.
| 2 | 2 | "Stag Night" | Edward Bennett | Michael Aitkens | 20 March 2004 | 5.53 |
Ashurst and Scribbins investigate the murder of Charlie Egan, who was found dead in a swimming pool on his stag night, having been handcuffed with his hands behind his back. His fiancée's father, the local mayor, soon becomes prime suspect.
| 3 | 3 | "Millionaire's Row" | David Innes Edwards | Nick Collins | 27 March 2004 | 4.65 |
Ashurst and Scribbins investigate the murder of Gideon Finch, who was found burnt to death in his car. He had reportedly been having an affair with his neighbour. It soon transpires that his wife was having an affair with his brother, who has no alibi.
| 4 | 4 | "Sanctuary" | David Innes Edwards | John Flanagan & Andy McCulloch | 3 April 2004 | 5.14 |
Ashurst and Scribbins investigate the stabbing of a charity shop worker, Lyn Chichester, who was working for a charity that raised money for animal sanctuaries in Africa. But tracing the money to its rightful owners proves slightly tricky.
| 5 | 5 | "A Good Deal of Attention" | Douglas Mackinnon | Michael Chadwick | 10 April 2004 | 5.64 |
Ashurst and Scribbins investigate the murder of Helen McKee, a popular member of staff at a local comprehensive school who has been the victim of a hit-and-run incident. It is soon discovered she was having an affair with parents of potential new students.
| 6 | 6 | "Noisy Neighbours" | Douglas Mackinnon | Nick Collins | 17 April 2004 | 6.64 |
Ashurst and Scribbins investigate the murder of Bernard Lloyd, who has been bashed to death with a hammer. Having a reputation for being a noisy neighbor soon proves to be the key to the motive for murder, with house sale issues top of the list.

=== Series 2 (2005) ===
| No. overall | No. in series | Title | Directed by | Written by | Original release date | UK viewers (millions) |
|---|---|---|---|---|---|---|
| 7 | 1 | "Witches" | Jonathan Fox Bassett | Nick Collins | 28 May 2005 | 4.26 |
Ashurst and Scribbins investigate the murder of a teenager who is found stabbed to death in a graveyard. The case soon turns out to more than unusual as it appears the motive may be linked to witchcraft. Meanwhile, with Sullivan on holiday, Ash and Scribbs are forced to deal with a new boss - DCI Whittle - whose pedantic and couldn't care less attitudes begin to get on their nerves.
| 8 | 2 | "Viva La Salsa" | Jonathan Fox Bassett | Scott Cherry | 18 June 2005 | 4.21 |
Ashurst and Scribbins investigate when Salsa student Sandra Foy falls to her death from the balcony of her expensive suburban home. Having recently stolen the dance partner of a very trained member of the dance class, it appears Sandra was much hated amongst her peers. However, CCTV footage uncovers a shocking revelation which threatens to blow the whole case wide open.
| 9 | 3 | "Death of an Estate Agent" | Roger Goldby | Emma Frost | 4 June 2005 | 4.33 |
Ashurst and Scribbins investigate when a well-hated estate agent Phil Jakes is found beaten to death in his office. A board which was initially believed to list Jakes' clients turns out to be a list of the women he has slept with, which soon unravels a possible motive for murder. However, in a massive twist in the case, someone who is believed to be long dead turns up - very much alive.
| 10 | 4 | "Wedding Bells" | Roger Goldby | Nick Collins | 11 June 2005 | 4.96 |
Ashurst and Scribbins investigate when the father of the bride is electrocuted in a pond during the reception party. A scattered crime scene and very few corresponding statements prove troublesome, but a marriage certificate found in the records archive soon throws up an unexpected motive. Meanwhile, Sullivan has his eye on a pretty blonde - and her top-of-the-range sports car.
| 11 | 5 | "Old Dogs" | Roger Goldby | Paul Waite | 25 June 2005 | 3.47 |
Ashurst and Scribbins investigate when popular dog lover and volunteer walker Christine Archer is killed in the woods where she is walking several dogs. It is soon discovered that Christine was giving evidence is a case of cruelty towards animals, a fact which Ash is sure forms the motive for murder. However, a picture taken at the scene by Christine begins to suggest otherwise.
| 12 | 6 | "Golden Oldies" | Robert Bierman | Scott Cherry | 2 July 2005 | 3.94 |
Ashurst and Scribbins investigate when a singer who had a string of hits in the fifties is found dead after being drowned in the bath at a residential home. JJ had many enemies but also many friends, but it soon becomes difficult to work out who is on what side. Meanwhile, Ash must face teasing from the team about the fact that she and Sullivan locked lips for an investigation.
