= I Want My Wife Back =

- Genre: Sitcom
- Written by: Mark Bussell; Justin Sbresni
- Directed by: Paul Norton Walker
- Starring: Ben Miller; Caroline Catz
- Country of origin: United Kingdom
- Original language: English
- No. of series: 1
- No. of episodes: 6

Production
- Executive producers: Sally Haynes; Laura Mackie
- Producers: Mark Bussell; Justin Sbresni; Busby Productions
- Editor: Adam Windmill
- Running time: 30 minutes

Original release
- Network: BBC One
- Release: 18 April – 23 May 2016

I Want My Wife Back is a British sitcom starring Ben Miller and Caroline Catz as Murray and Bex respectively.

The series premiered on April 18, 2016 and ended on May 23, 2016, with a total of 6 episodes over the course of 1 season.

== Plot ==
Forty-six year old Murray is a nice guy; everyone says so. So no-one is more surprised than Murray when, on her 40th birthday and after 12 years of marriage, his wife Bex walks out on him. He feels bewildered and lost. Bex's mum and dad & his dad, in particular, are upset, and his attempts at helping them get back together fail. This begins Murray's quest to discover what went wrong and how to win her back, though it's less a journey than a floundering stumble in the dark towards the prize of returning his life to something approaching normality. All the while he's having to manage the demands of his ultra-needy team members at the office, as well as navigating his way through the well-meaning but counter-productive advice from friends and family.

Bex moves in with a single friend, who is obsessed with helping other formerly married women whose husbands have been unfaithful (though Murray hasn't). Bex's dad moves in with Murray - both feel quite depressed. Murray's boss (Curtis) is having an affair with another woman, and he gets Murray to tell stories that he was at work meetings. Meanwhile Emma (played by Susannah Fielding) a colleague at work, who as a crush on Murray is so pleased by the news and asks him out but, says other colleagues are going out with them when it's actually a date. She's only 27 and he's 46 so Bex thinks he's moving on and seems even less likely to get back with him. Murray wakes up in Emma's bed naked, unsure of what happened the night before. Bex moves in with her sister Keeley. Murray tries to re-propose to Bex, recalling they first met on a scuba diving course and visits Keeley's flat to find a positive pregnancy test which he assumes is Bex's (but is in fact Keeley's). There is resulting confusion when Murray lets the news of the pregnancy (which he hasn't verified with Bex) slip to Don and Paula (Bex and Keeley's parents) who congratulate the wrong daughter. The final episode uses the scuba theme for Bex and Murray to come to a final reconciliation.

The series was compared with The Worst Week of My Life, which also starred Ben Miller as a man with bad luck where everything that can go wrong does, with plenty of embarrassing funny moments.

== Reception ==
The Radio Times' Alison Graham said "Though I might like to think that my comedy heart is made of coal and coated in tar, I am a sucker for silliness". "I can’t help rather liking I Want My Wife Back. Miller is a deft light comedian, as is Catz, who plays the unfortunate Bex (though she needs to be given more to do). But it doesn’t have a mean bone in its body and it’s silly. It reminds me, too, of comedies from my childhood. Terry Scott would have worn the role of Murray like a leather driving glove, though he didn’t have Miller’s charm. There should always be room for good-hearted sitcoms. Peter Kay's Car Share, which has been shortlisted for a Bafta Radio Times Audience Award (vote here!), was lovely".

"I found myself ending the first episode with some faint interest in what happens next to the two protagonists. I know that’s not such a ringing endorsement, but like Murray and Bex’s marriage, the show shouldn’t be written off just yet. Smell my cheese."

"It’s a fairly straightforward premise – a couple splitting but not quite seamlessly splitting – and this being BBC1 it doesn’t exactly push the envelope creatively. But you can see a few quirkier subplots brewing that might spice things up – the boss who needs Murray to cover up for his philandering, the colleague who has a crush on Murray, the deadpan Welsh Asian friend with sexual issues who confides in Murray. Miller is never less than enjoyable as besuited, bewildered Murray. He is very good at Jack Lemmon-ish repressed comedy stress and juggling lots of comedic balls – verbal, physical – at the same time. He is also very good at showing how Murray is essentially a good person but a bit crap at organizing his life. Some scenes are a bit blinking obvious though. When he walks in on an anger management group, for instance, guess what - someone gets angry. But as I said, this is BBC1. The most radical aspect is that this is not a studio-based Mrs Brown's Boys sitcom. Don't expect Catastrophe or Toast of London though, but IWMWB is certainly darker than Miranda. File under "potentially good" rather than "must-see".

== Cast ==
- Ben Miller as Murray
- Caroline Catz as Bex
- Peter Wright as Don (Bex's father)
- Jan Francis as Paula (Bex's mother)
- Cariad Lloyd as Keeley (Bex's sister)
- Kenneth Collard as Grant
- Susannah Fielding as Emma (Murray's colleague, who has a crush on him)
- Stewart Wright as Curtis
- Kate Miles as Tamzin
- Abigail Thaw as Abby
- Priyanga Burford as Nareesha
- James Lance as Julian Wolverton

== Episodes ==
No.	Title	Original release date	UK viewers (millions)
1	"Chapter One"	18 April 2016	3.75
On his way back from another work trip, Murray hears that his beloved wife Bex might be leaving him on the day of her 40th birthday. He desperately tries to find her before the surprise birthday party he has arranged gets under way.
2	"Chapter Two"	25 April 2016	3.5
Murray attempts to persuade Bex that a holiday is just what they need to repair some damage, but it's not enough to convince her and she leaves him heartbroken at the airport. Unable to tell their family truth, they decide to tell them they are abroad, but their plan is ruined when Bex unexpectedly bumps into her mother. Meanwhile, Murray is offered a promotion at the bank and finds himself covering for his adulterous boss Curtis, which is the last thing he needs. Murray and Bex reluctantly break the news to their friends and family that they are separating. Bex's father, Don, takes the news particularly badly. Bex attempts to embark on her exciting new life without Murray by joining Abby's book club.
3	"Chapter Three"	2 May 2016	N/A
Curtis asks Murray to stand in for him as the bank's representative on the committee for the hospital's CT scanner appeal - which Bex is chairing. He decides to support her by helping her raise as much money as possible at the event she is organising, selling tickets to his friends, family and colleagues and arranges a celebrity appearance by Joanna Lumley for the evening, but the celebrity fails to turn up and instead they auction of a date with Bex and Murray is not highest bidder.
4	"Chapter Four"	9 May 2016	N/A
Bex agrees to go for dinner with Murray at Lorenzo's, the Italian restaurant where he proposed, but his big plans for the evening are scuppered by a series of unfortunate incidents, when Grant loses the ring he was supposed to bring and things go from bad to worse when Julian Wolverton turns up.
5	"Chapter Five"	16 May 2016	N/A
Bex moves in with her sister Keeley, whilst Murray makes a big decision about his future. Together, they try to decide who should have custody of their dog Barney. Murray tells Bex he has decided to leave his job, but is disappointed when he doesn't quite get the positive reaction that he was looking for. He returns to the office where Emma invites him out for a night out with some of their colleagues that evening, but when he arrives at the pub it turns out that it's just him and Emma - they proceed to get quite drunk. Meanwhile, Bex feels bad about her reaction to his news and goes round to his house - only to be told by Grant that he's out with Emma.
6	"Chapter Six"	23 May 2016	N/A
Murray drops one of Bex's dresses round to her at Keeley's flat for her parents' anniversary party that evening and finds a positive pregnancy test in her temporary bedroom, prompting him to try everything he can do to get her back. At the bank, he tries to get a definitive answer from Emma on whether or not anything happened between them that night, but she is distracted and unable to give him a straight answer, while Keeley has a big decision about the future of her relationship.

== Home release ==
All six episodes of I Want My Wife Back were released on DVD in Region 2, on 30 May 2016.
