= Matlock Mercury =

Newspaper

- Type: Weekly local newspaper
- Format: Tabloid
- Owner: Johnston Press
- Editor: Graeme Huston
- Founded: 1940s
- Headquarters: Derbyshire Times, Chesterfield
- Website: matlockmercury.co.uk

The Matlock Mercury is a weekly newspaper published on a Thursday in the United Kingdom which serves Matlock, Darley Dale, Wirksworth, Bakewell and smaller villages in the Derbyshire Dales area of Derbyshire.

The Matlock Mercury began life in the late 1940s as Coming Events, an entertainments guide published by Ella Smith from her house on Bakewell Road, Matlock which remained as the newspaper's home until October 2000 when a new office opened on Firs Parade in the centre of the town.

The name Matlock Mercury was adopted in the mid-1950s. Much of the newspaper's archive was destroyed when four feet of water struck during flooding in 1965. The printing works, which shared the same building until 1996, were also badly damaged. Ella Smith sold the Mercury to John Uprichard a successful journalist and TV news reporter in the mid-1970s. Uprichard modernised and updated the facilities and printing works to provide a modern newspaper aided by his wife Beryl Uprichard. The Mercury was eventually taken over by the Derbyshire Times and its owners, Johnston Press.

== Don Hale and the Stephen Downing case ==
Stephen Downing, was a 17-year-old with the reading age of an 11-year-old, who was imprisoned for the murder of Wendy Sewell in Bakewell in 1973. He served 27 years in jail. A long campaign by Downing's family and Don Hale, the then editor of the Matlock Mercury led to the conviction being declared unsafe by the Court of Appeal in 2001 and Downing was released. Hale was voted Man of the Year by The Observer newspaper, Journalist of the Year by What the Papers Say and was awarded an Order of the British Empire for his efforts, though he was also criticised for referring to Sewell as the "Bakewell Tart".

The case, and Don Hale's campaign, was featured in the 2004 BBC drama In Denial of Murder in which Stephen Tompkinson played Don Hale and Caroline Catz played Wendy Sewell. The drama was based on Hale's book Town Without Pity (Century, 2002), which he updated in 2019 as Murder in the Graveyard (HarperElement).
