= Don Hale =

British author and journalist (born 1952)

Don Hale OBE (born July 1952) is a British author and journalist known for his investigative work and campaigning against miscarriage of justice in specific legal cases.

== Early life ==
Hale played football at youth and reserve level for Bury, Blackburn Rovers, York City and Shrewsbury Town.

== Career ==
While editor of the Bury Messenger in the early 1980s, he says Barbara Castle, then the local Member of the European Parliament gave him confidential information on political figures who appeared sympathetic to the Paedophile Information Exchange and indicated that several high ranking senior politicians were also allegedly involved in promoting a Westminster paedophile circle. After refusing pressure to hand over the dossier put on him by Cyril Smith MP and Special Branch not to publish it, his office was then raided by SB officers and the papers were confiscated with the threat of prison.

== Bakewell murder ==
He was later editor of the Matlock Mercury, where he became involved in the campaign to overturn the murder conviction of Stephen Downing. In 1973, Downing, at the time a 17-year-old with the reading age of an 11-year-old, was imprisoned for the murder of Wendy Sewell and served 27 years in jail. Following his six-year campaign, the conviction was eventually quashed and declared unsafe by the Court of Appeal in 2001 and Downing was released.

Downing remains the prime and only suspect in the case, with police reinvestigations finding that all the alternative suspects suggested by Don Hale could be eliminated from inquiries. Downing, meanwhile, was the only suspect who could not be eliminated. Don Hale's book was subsequently criticised for falsehoods and inaccuracies, and police considered bringing charges against him for its contents.

When the law of double jeopardy was changed in England and Wales in 2005, allowing individuals who had previously been acquitted of a crime to be re-tried in certain circumstances, Derbyshire Police applied to the Crown Prosecution Service to re-charge Downing. However, as of 2026, Downing has not been retried.

=== In Denial of Murder changes ===
Hale's work on the case eventually helped to force a change in both European and British law, allowing any prisoner, particularly in denial of murder (IDOM) and/or convicted of any serious offence, to be allowed to appeal for parole consideration directly to the Parole Board. Downing's case was one of three test cases originally presented to the European Court of Human Rights by barrister Edward Fitzgerald. After several years of debate and despite a late appeal from the British Government, the case went in Downing's favour and he received £500 in compensation. When the murder conviction was later quashed, Downing also received over £900,000 in compensation. Hale's first book about the Stephen Downing appeal case, Town Without Pity, became a best-seller. It was adapted into a BBC TV drama starring Stephen Tompkinson and Caroline Catz called In Denial of Murder. In 2016 Judge Robert Rinder featured Hale's updated, revised, and informative book 'Murder in the Graveyard' published by HarperCollins, and featured Hale's long quest for justice within a one-hour special on ITV 1 for Judge Rinder's Crime series. The show was repeated in July 2018. Taking part were Hale, Stephen Downing and a cold case detective Chris Clark, who believes Wendy Sewell, the victim in the Bakewell murder, for which Downing was eventually cleared, may have been another victim of the notorious Yorkshire Ripper Peter Sutcliffe.

It was 2019, when Hale was asked by publishers HarperCollins to write his exclusive and heavily updated version of his original story about his successful campaign work on the Stephen Downing appeal case. The book entitled Murder in the Graveyard contained new and updated information about his long discovery to find the evidence that helped to quash Downing's conviction, and revealed a number of compelling clues and fresh evidence that indicated who may have been responsible for the brutal murder of Wendy Sewell in September 1973.

=== Awards ===
Hale was voted 2001 Man of the Year by The Observer newspaper, Journalist of the Year by What the Papers Say and was made an OBE for his efforts and campaigning journalism. He also won numerous other journalistic awards including regional and national awards.

== Other cases ==
Hale has also been heavily involved in the controversial case of Barry George, jailed for life for the murder of BBC TV star Jill Dando. Hale also played a key role in investigating and helping to free former police officer Graham Huckerby who was wrongly jailed for allegedly being part of a major bullion robbery gang. Both prisoners eventually had their convictions quashed.

During 2013, Hale began investigating an alleged miscarriage of justice for ex-Sheffield United footballer Ched Evans, who was convicted of the rape of a teenage girl in Rhyl and sentenced to five years in jail. Hale helped present fresh evidence to the Independent Police Complaints Commission (IPCC) on behalf and in support of the family's claim that the police inquiry was flawed, and that much of the evidence that could have helped his defence, was not presented at trial. Evans was routinely released from prison on licence in October 2014 and evidence sent to the Criminal Cases Review Commission. On 6 October 2015, they announced that they were referring the case back to the Court of Appeal, where he was later acquitted. Evans faced a retrial in October 2016 and the jury took three hours to return a 12–0 verdict of not guilty.

== Books ==
After a short spell working for the North Wales Pioneer newspaper, Hale became editor of the newly formed North Wales Living magazine in 2005. He won a succession of prestigious awards but later left to pursue other interests. During the autumn of 2007, his book about the famous frogman "Buster" Crabb spy mystery, called The Final Dive, was published by Suttons/The History Press. Hale has also had published Secrets of the Royal Detective about his great-grandfather, James Wood, a notable Manchester detective from 1890 to 1914, who was also the first Royal Protection Officer acting as a personal bodyguard to the Prince of Wales, following the death of Queen Victoria.

Hale's book, Mallard - How the Blue Streak broke the World Speed Record, also became a popular best seller and was first released in paperback by Aurum Press in May 2008 to coincide with the 70th anniversary of the speed record for steam locomotives held by LNER Class A4 4468 Mallard. The book was reprinted and published in July 2013 as a specially updated version for the 75th anniversary of Mallard breaking the world speed record on 3 July 1938, by publishers Aurum Press. An updated book was officially re-launched at the NRM in York on 3 July 2013 as part of the Great Gathering commemorations. Hale also produced and published a new railway history book - Mallard, the Railway Marvel that Beat the World in July 2018 to help commemorate the 80th anniversary of Mallard winning the world speed record.

Hale has written several other books, including a crime novel titled The Wrong Body and non-fiction works such as The Child Killers, Sounds of the Sixties - Club 60 & the Esquire, Birth of the British Bobby, The World of Dreams, Joe Cocker and the Clubs, Sherlock Holmes and the Ghost Ship Mystery.

Hale first wrote about the Stephen Downing case in Town Without Pity (Century, 2002), and revised and updated it as Murder in the Graveyard (2019, HarperElement).

== Freelance ==
Hale returned to mainstream newspapers working freelance from January 2014.

== See also ==
- Murders of Jacqueline Ansell-Lamb and Barbara Mayo, claimed by Hale to be linked to the murder of Wendy Sewell
