= The Vice (TV series) =

British television crime drama series (1999–2003)

- Genre: Crime drama
- Created by: Barry Simner; Rob Pursey
- Starring: Ken Stott; Caroline Catz; David Harewood; Marc Warren; Rosie Marcel; Tim Pigott-Smith; Mel Raido; Tamzin Malleson
- Country of origin: United Kingdom
- Original language: English
- No. of series: 5
- No. of episodes: 28

Production
- Producer: Stephen Smallwood
- Running time: 60–120 minutes (inc. adverts)
- Production companies: Carlton Television; Touchpaper Television

Original release
- Network: ITV
- Release: 4 January 1999 – 1 July 2003

The new title card for "The Vice", used only during the fifth series, following Ken Stott's departure and a major overhaul of the series.

The Vice is an ITV police drama about the Metropolitan Police Vice Unit, which ran for five series of varying lengths between 4 January 1999 and 1 July 2003. The main cast included Ken Stott, Caroline Catz and David Harewood, as well as Rosie Marcel, Marc Warren and Tim Pigott-Smith. The show experimented with different formats throughout its five series. Series 1 and 2 combined consisted of seven two–part stories, i.e. fourteen episodes in total, lasting one hour per episode and two hours per story. Series 3 and 4 combined consisted of eight self-contained 90 minute episodes. The final series, i.e. Series 5, consisted of six self-contained 60 minute episodes. The Portishead track "Sour Times" was used as the theme music to the show.

"Hooked", although often referred to as the first episode of series five, and broadcast in 2003 prior to the broadcast of series five, was officially classified as the last episode of series four as it featured the last appearance of Pat Chappel, and was filmed during the filming block of series four. It was also the last episode to be ninety-minutes long, before the transfer to one-hour episodes, and it was also the last time that the original title card and sequence were used.

== Main cast ==
Cast member	Character	Episode duration
Ken Stott	Inspector Pat Chappel	"Daughters (Part One)" (Ep. 1) – "Hooked" (Ep. 22)
Caroline Catz	Police Constable Cheryl Hutchins	"Daughters (Part One)" (Ep. 1) – "Lust" (Ep. 28)
David Harewood	Sergeant/Inspector Joe Robinson	"Daughters (Part One)" (Ep. 1) – "Lust" (Ep. 28)
Marc Warren	Police Constable Dougie Raymond	"Daughters (Part One)" (Ep. 1) – "Walking on Water (Part Two)" (Ep. 10)
Garry Cooper	Superintendent Jeff Callard	"Daughters (Part One)" (Ep. 1) – "Betrayed (Part Two)" (Ep. 12)
Rosie Marcel	Police Constable Kirsty Morgan	"Out of Mind" (Ep. 15) – "Lust" (Ep. 28)
Tim Pigott-Smith	Detective Sergeant/Inspector/Chief Inspector Frank Vickers	"Out of Mind" (Ep. 15), "Falling" (Ep. 18), "Hooked" (Ep. 22) – "Lust" (Ep. 28)
Mel Raido	Police Constable Adam Parkes	"Hooked" (Ep. 22) – "Lust" (Ep. 28)
Tamzin Malleson	Police Constable Lorraine Johnstone	"Control" (Ep. 23) – "Lust" (Ep. 28)
Jake Nightingale	Sergeant Stuart Cole	"Control" (Ep. 23) – "Lust" (Ep. 28)
Anna Chancellor	Dr. Christina Weir	"Daughters (Part One)" (Ep. 1) – "Dabbling (Part Two)" (Ep. 6)
Diane Parish	Shirley Robinson	"Home is the Place (Part One)" (Ep. 7) – "Lovesick (Part Two)" (Ep. 14)
Valerie Edmond	Detective Inspector Janet Greer	"Betrayed (Part One)" (Ep. 11) – "Lovesick (Part Two)" (Ep. 14)
Sarah Parish	Jane Farrell	"Out of Mind" (Ep. 15) – "Falling" (Ep. 18)
Victoria Shalet	Sarah Farrell	"Out of Mind" (Ep. 15) – "Falling" (Ep. 18)

== Episodes ==
=== Series overview ===
Series	Episodes	Originally released	
Series	Episodes	First released	Last released
1	6	4 January 1999	8 February 1999
2	8	10 January 2000	28 February 2000
3	4	17 January 2001	7 February 2001
4	4	18 February 2002	26 May 2002
5	6	27 May 2003	1 July 2003

=== Series 1 (1999) ===
No.	Title	Directed by	Written by	Original release date	UK viewers (millions)
1	"Daughters"	Douglas Mackinnon	Barry Simner	4 January 1999	10.08
2	"Daughters"	Douglas Mackinnon	Barry Simner	11 January 1999	10.61
Chappel finds himself involved in a turf war between two rival pimps when he investigates the murder of a prostitute. Whilst gathering evidence against his prime suspect, he takes the high class Nikki under his wing and learns that her pimp, David Hinkley, is physically abusive towards her. He resolves to help her after she refuses to give a statement to the police, and gets personally involved trying to protect her from Hinkley, ostensibly, a respectable family man. Hinkley is less than pleased at the attention he is receiving, but it is Chappel that Hinkley turns to when his own daughter is kidnapped by a rival pimp. Meanwhile, Chappel begins an affair with his psychiatrist, Christina.
3	"Sons"	Roger Gartland	Paul Henry Powell	18 January 1999	9.30
4	"Sons"	Roger Gartland	Paul Henry Powell	25 January 1999	8.96
Cheryl's capability is called into question when she blows an undercover operation, and Chappel subsequently refers her to Christina in order to talk out her problems. Meanwhile, when a videotape of a high-profile MP having sex with two rent boys is stolen, a blackmail scam ensues in order to ensure the safe return of the tape. As the film-making continues, Chappel becomes obsessed with saving the two boys from the clutches of what he perceives to be an S&M filmmaker and a paedophile, and attempts to use their information to bring down other suspected paedophiles working in the area. Chappel and Christina struggle to keep their relationship professional, and soon end up in bed together.
5	"Dabbling"	David Thacker	J.C. Wilsher	1 February 1999	8.98
6	"Dabbling"	David Thacker	J.C. Wilsher	8 February 1999	8.86
The team are tasked with investigating an escort agency, who are providing a sideline in drugs trafficking and prostitution to their more than satisfied customers. Chappel decides to send Dougie undercover as a punter in order to gather evidence on the agency. Dougie successfully manages to secure the evidence, but soon finds himself hooked on prostitutes. When he falls hopelessly in love with one particular girl, he attempts to woo her into a real relationship, instead of a business arrangement. However, when the girl subsequently disappears out of the country in order to traffic drugs, Dougie goes on the rampage and jeopardises the entire case – and sparks the end of his career in Vice. Final appearance of Dr. Christina Weir.

=== Series 2 (2000) ===
No. overall	No. in series	Title	Directed by	Written by	Original release date	UK viewers (millions)
7	1	"Home is the Place"	Roger Gartland	Barry Simner	10 January 2000	9.02
8	2	"Home is the Place"	Roger Gartland	Barry Simner	17 January 2000	8.77
When Chappel finds a young girl working as a prostitute in Soho, he attempts to uncover her identity. When he discovers that she has absconded from a children's home in Sheffield, he decides to pay them a visit. Upon arrival, he soon discovers that all is not what it seems and learns that young girls are being lured away, with the promise of gifts and a life of luxury, in order to work the streets of London. A huge web of lies and deceit covering up a dangerous ring of child abusers is discovered to be limited not only to those now living in the home but to past residents as well. When Chappel suspects the involvement of one of the staff members at the home, he encounters a frightening chain of events. First appearance of Shirley Robinson.
9	3	"Walking on Water"	Matthew Evans	J.C. Wilsher	24 January 2000	8.28
10	4	"Walking on Water"	Matthew Evans	J.C. Wilsher	31 January 2000	7.84
The Vice team are tasked with investigating an illegal gambling and prostitution ring being operated from out of a pub, with Chappel and Cheryl posing as thrill-seekers. However, when Chappel nearly blows his cover, he is shocked to discover that the haunt that they are trying to investigate is frequented by former Vice officer Dougie. Chappel begins to use Dougie's connections to the gang operators as a means of gathering evidence, but when Dougie's level of enthusiasm – and hope that his efforts may win him his job back in Vice – backfire, Chappel's reliance on using Dougie to expose the illicit gambling and prostitution ring is left in tatters. When Dougie's cover is blown, he is consequently killed. Final appearance of PC Dougie Raymond
11	5	"Betrayed"	Phillipa Langdale	Anita J. Pandolfo	7 February 2000	8.17
12	6	"Betrayed"	Phillipa Langdale	Anita J. Pandolfo	14 February 2000	7.37
When the team raid a brothel being operated as a massage parlour, they discover that the young female employees have been smuggled into the country from refugee camps in Eastern Europe. One of the girls offers to testify against the owner of the brothel, but only if she is given round-the-clock protection. Chappel assigns Joe Robinson to the case, unaware that the girl is actually harboring feelings for Joe. When his wife becomes suspicious of his interactions with the girl, he finds his marriage on the rocks and the impending pressures of the job becoming too much. When the girl reveals she is pregnant and changes her mind about testifying, Chappel is forced to find new evidence. First appearance of D.I. Janet Greer. Final appearance of Superintendent Jeff Callard.
13	7	"Lovesick"	Unknown	Simon Tyrell	21 February 2000	8.07
14	8	"Lovesick"	Unknown	Simon Tyrell	28 February 2000	7.77
Joe and Cheryl are on a stake-out, watching a violent pimp who is suspected of attacking one of his girls. When the pimp confronts him, Joe, still wound-up about the events of the last case, and the impending collapse of his marriage, attacks him in the street in front of several onlookers. When the pimp is found murdered the next day, the blame is soon directed to Joe's door, with evidence of his run-in from the day before. With Joe's increasing tendency for violence and aggression, it seems to make him the prime suspect, but Chappel thinks otherwise and sets out to find who the real killer is. When he discovers a rivalry with a fellow pimp, it proves to be the evidence to reveal Joe's innocence. Final appearances of D.I. Janet Greer and Shirley Robinson.

=== Series 3 (2001) ===
No. overall	No. in series	Title	Directed by	Written by	Original release date	UK viewers (millions)
15	1	"Out of Mind"	Roger Gartland	Barry Simner	17 January 2001	8.72
When Chappel's former boss Frank Vickers is found lurking in the basement during a raid on a Soho brothel, it soon transpires that Chappel has a more-than-shady past involving a former prostitute, Jane, with whom he fell in love. Vickers is determined to stop at nothing to clear his name, and Chappel's life looks set to be blown apart when Vickers reveals some very sordid secrets to his colleagues in Vice. Chappel goes in search of Jane, and discovers that one of her friends, whom he was friendly with, disappeared some years previously and has never been found. When Chappel finds the body in the basement of the brothel, he becomes determined to prove Vickers' involvement in her death. First appearances of DS Frank Vickers, PC Kirsty Morgan, Jane Farrell and Sarah Farrell.
16	2	"Into the Night"	Julian Holmes	Barry Simner	24 January 2001	7.37
While attending the trial of a prostitute accused of murdering her pimp, Chappel tries a little gentle persuasion in an attempt to get the prosecuting barrister to press harder to gain a conviction, unaware of his own personal troubles. When the barrister is caught with a prostitute in a car park by Cheryl and Kirsty, he uses the excuse that he is 'gathering first hand research' for Chappel and is let off with a caution. When he is caught again, Chappel realises he has unleashed a more dangerous beast than he ever could have realised. Meanwhile, Joe and Kirsty start to develop an explosive relationship, and when Jane loses her new job and goes back on the game, Chappel soon has problems of his own.
17	3	"Force of Nature"	Justin Chadwick	Clive Bradley	31 January 2001	8.05
Chappel goes undercover in a prison for sex offenders, in order to flush out the ringleaders of a prostitution racket, which involves both the inmates and the prison staff. Reports suggest that inmates are being threatened with violence unless they allow the ringleaders to have group sex with their wives and girlfriends. However, it turns out to be a far more sinister conspiracy. Joe is unhappy with the situation and tries to get Chappel out of the prison, but being so close to collecting the vital evidence, Chappel goes against his wishes and decides to stay undercover. Posing as Chappel's girlfriend, Cheryl is targeted by the group, while Chappel's behaviour becomes more and more erratic.
18	4	"Falling"	Roger Gartland	Simon Tyrell	7 February 2001	7.53
Chappel hopes to resume his relationship with ex-girlfriend Jane despite her descent into prostitution, but his plans are threatened when Vickers begins sniffing around her too. The team are paid a visit by one of Vickers' colleagues, DC Hills, who informs Chappel that he suspects Vickers of being bent, and wants to bring him down in any way he possibly can. Using Hills, Chappel sets up a secret sting operation, but soon realises that he is being double crossed, and Vickers has sent Hills to trap him. Determined to give his enemy the treatment he deserves, with the help of Jane, he invents a fake, but believable, rape claim in order to make sure that Vickers goes down for as long as possible. Final appearances of Jane Farrell and Sarah Farrell.

=== Series 4 (2002) ===
No. overall	No. in series	Title	Directed by	Written by	Original release date	UK viewers (millions)
19	1	"Trade"	Justin Chadwick	Clive Bradley	18 February 2002	7.42
When several prostitutes are murdered in the financial heart of London, Chappel reaches out to working girl Sandra, warning her to stay away from the unit's prime suspect, Gordon Ellis, an arrogant financier whom he suspects of the murders. Chappel manages to uncover a link between all three of the murder victims and Ellis, but Cheryl isn't so sure that the CCTV footage which supposedly captures the second victim with Ellis is concrete evidence. As Chappel gets dangerously involved with Sandra, he becomes obsessed with nailing Ellis for the crimes, and sends Kirsty undercover in an attempt to prove his involvement. Meanwhile, a sceptical Joe receives news of his promotion, and announces he is leaving. Sgt. Joe Robinson is promoted to Inspector.
20	2	"No Man's Land"	Tim Leandro	Mike Cullen	25 February 2002	6.43
Chappel is delighted when retired prostitute Clara comes forward and offers to give evidence against Keith Beaumont, a former porn baron whom Chappel suspects is still operating in the prostitution underworld. However, his past encounters with Beaumont begin to cloud his judgement and enthused by her boss' take on the task, Kirsty offers herself as bait in a dangerous undercover honeytrap. Suspecting that Kirsty may well have slept with Beaumont, Joe is less than pleased and persuades his new boss to allow him a week's secondment back to Vice in order to give Chappel a hand in his quest to prove Beaumont's guilt. When it's revealed in interview that Kirsty had sex with Beaumont, the case is blown wide open.
21	3	"One More Time"	Jon East	Alison Hume	11 March 2002	5.51
Chappel goes undercover as an insurance-broking lodger to investigate a suspected porn merchant, who is making a sideline in dirty movies whilst running his own above-board video rental shop. But when he discovers that the house he's staying in is in fact the base for a paedophile ring, the case is recategorised and taken away from Vice, and Chappel is furious when he discovers that the case has been handed to Joe – his first assignment since his promotion to Inspector. Cheryl begins to question her loyalty to Chappel. Unable to standby and watch a twelve-year-old girl being abused, Chappel attacks the prime suspect and destroys any chance of bringing down the paedophile ring.
22	4	"Hooked"	Ashley Pearce	Barry Simner	26 May 2003	6.67
Disgraced Chappel has been transferred to a desk job following the events of the operation into the paedophile ring, and Frank Vickers has been drafted in to head-up the vice squad as his replacement. When Chappel discovers that Cheryl has disappeared during an undercover operation into a pornographer, he becomes obsessed with finding her. Using his informants Chappel manages to locate Cheryl, only to see her destroying herself with a powerful addiction to crack cocaine. Risking everything to save her, and under a watchful eye from Vickers, Chappel takes Cheryl to a safe house. When he discovers that the pornographer raped her, he loses control and finds himself up on a murder charge. Last appearance of DI Pat Chappel; Frank Vickers is promoted to Inspector; first appearance of PC Adam Parkes.

=== Series 5 (2003) ===
No. overall	No. in series	Title	Directed by	Written by	Original release date	UK viewers (millions)
23	1	"Control"	Jon East	Mike Cullen	27 May 2003	5.36
Following Vickers promotion to Chief Inspector, Joe makes a welcome return to Vice, and on his first day back, he becomes determined to nail a violent pimp, who is involved with the disappearance of two of his girls. As he and rookie Lorraine interview Miles Wilson, the mother of his latest victim is brought in to sit with her daughter during questioning. When she recognizes Vickers from their past dealings, she threatens to reveal their lurid past if he doesn't deal with her daughter's case personally. As he persuades Joe to get both the mother and daughter to testify, Joe goes to visit Cheryl in rehab, and is stunned to discover that her way of controlling her addiction is to watch punters buying drugs on the street. First appearances of Sgt. Stuart Cole and PC Lorraine Johnstone; Frank Vickers is promoted to Chief Inspector.
24	2	"Gameboys"	Justin Chadwick	Ben Cooper	3 June 2003	4.49
The team investigate an amusement arcade manager suspected of recruiting young runaways as rent boys, and Adam is sent undercover in an attempt to gather evidence. While Adam is drawn into the deep end, Joe is led on a wild goose chase by one of the boys involved. When Adam's attempt to trap the prime suspect fails, and the boy whom he is trying to encourage to give evidence starts to ignore him, he suddenly realises that he is being drawn into a whole other ball game. Meanwhile, Kirsty becomes jealous when Cheryl returns to Vice and immediately applies for promotion to sergeant. Kirsty reveals her emotions to Vickers, who suggests that she too should apply for promotion within the team.
25	3	"Untouchable"	Michael Samuels	Alison Hume	10 June 2003	4.88
The licence of a pole-dancing club is up for renewal, and Joe is determined to bring down the manageress, who is thought to be running the club as a front for a prostitution racket. Vickers goes undercover to collude with the club's owner, while Adam and Stuart are tasked with being punters for the night. When Lorraine decides to stay-on after hours, she notices Vickers on CCTV returning to the club and taking a woman with him into the toilets. Joe then becomes suspicious of his behaviour after he appears to be colluding with the chief suspect – and using the club's services for himself. Meanwhile, after being left off the operation, Kirsty starts to feel that she is becoming more and more outcast from the team.
26	4	"Outcast"	Nick Laughland	Mike Cullen	17 June 2003	4.37
Joe and Kirsty are called to the scene of a prostitute found dead in a skip, only to discover that the Serious Crime Group have taken on the case. When DI Delaney requests one of the Vice squad is seconded to his team, Joe has no reluctance in sending out an ever-increasing problem that is Kirsty. As Cheryl's instinct proves to be Vice's key in gathering evidence on the suspect, little does Kirsty know that she is out of her depth where her new senior officer is concerned. When he tries to force her to have sex, Kirsty realises he has been manipulating her from the start. Joe is the only one who doesn't fall for her seductive charms, while Delaney is secretly trying to deliberately ruin her career.
27	5	"Birdhouse"	Jon East	Shan Khan	24 June 2003	4.38
While Vickers and Kirsty are away from the office on an official home office jaunt, Adam and Stuart go undercover in a club in an attempt to gather information on the owner, who is suspected of dealing drugs. Adam realises that their only hope in finding drugs is through the VIP lounge, but upon gaining entry, the pair stumble upon much more than a drugs outfit, and discover that the owner is the ringleader of a human trafficking gang. Adam tries to rescue a foreign girl who he has developed an interest for and becomes involved in the debacle, leading to a stern warning from Joe. Family man Stuart is struggling with the undercover lifestyle and comes head-to-head with his wife, who forces him to choose.
28	6	"Lust"	Gavin Millar	Clive Bradley	1 July 2003	4.57
Joe and Stuart are trailing a suspect whom they discover has involvement with a major drugs and prostitution racket, but are shocked when they find his boss having dinner with Lorraine. Vickers is desperate to use Lorraine's relationship with the pimp for his own ends when he realizes if publicly known, it would have a deleterious impact on Vice, and is determined to sacrifice her while there's still time. As he strikes a deal with the pimp, Joe unknowingly sends Lorraine undercover to gather information. Meanwhile, Kirsty's relationship with Vickers becomes treacherous, and Joe is quickly catching up with him. Determined to nail Vickers to the wall, Kirsty lodges a sexual harassment complaint.

== DVD releases ==
=== Region 2 ===
- Series 1: 7 July 2003, released in the United Kingdom by Carlton.
- Series 1–5: 20 February 2006, released in the UK by Network

=== Region 1 ===
- Series 1: 25 March 2008, released in the US by MPI Home Video.
- Series 2: 24 June 2008, released in the US by MPI Home Video.
