= Bonkers (British TV series) =

2007 British television series

Bonkers is a British television series written by Sally Wainwright and starring Liza Tarbuck. It was transmitted on ITV in 2007. It was also released on DVD.

The series is available on DVD, distributed by Acorn Media UK.

In July 2007, the playwright and actress Tricia Walsh-Smith filed a claim in the High Court for breach of copyright, claiming that the pilot episode was copied from her 1987 play, also called Bonkers.

== Cast ==
- Liza Tarbuck as Helen Barker
- Mark Addy as Tony Barker
- Alex Hassell as Felix Nash
- Charles Aitken as Tim Barker
- Sylvestra Le Touzel as Harriet Waterhouse
- Oliver Chris as Marcus Lewis
- Tim Dutton as Jeremy Waterhouse
- Sandra Reinton as Imelda Lewis
- Stewart Wright as John Lewis
- Lynda Bellingham as Mrs. Wadlow
- Francesca Kingdon as Nicole
- Cathy Tyson as DI Short
- Steve John Shepherd as Andrew
- Georgia Moffett as Debbie Hooper
