= Real Men (British TV series) =

- Genre: Crime drama
- Written by: Frank Deasy
- Directed by: Sallie Aprahamian
- Starring: Ben Daniels; Charles Dale; Ewan Stewart; Zoe Telford; Christine Tremarco; Caroline Catz; Harry Eden; Steve John Shepherd; Stephen Lord; Emil Marwa
- Composer: Daniel Pemberton
- Country of origin: United Kingdom
- Original language: English
- No. of series: 1
- No. of episodes: 2

Production
- Executive producers: Frank Deasy; Victoria Evans; Barbara McKissack
- Producer: David Snodin
- Cinematography: Tim Palmer
- Editor: Luke Dunley
- Running time: 90 minutes
- Production company: BBC Scotland

Original release
- Network: BBC Two
- Release: 12 March – 13 March 2003

Real Men is a two-part British television crime drama series, written by playwright Frank Deasy and directed by Sallie Aphramain, that first broadcast on BBC Two on 12 and 13 March 2003.

The series stars Ben Daniels as Detective Inspector Matthew Fenton, who after re-opening the cold case of a missing child, finds himself drawn to a local orphanage where he suspects the caretaker of sexual improprieties with the minors.

== Production ==
The script for the series took writer Frank Deasy more than four years to write. Daniels commented on the role of Fenton; "Fenton is a deeply moral man, he's likable and kind. But, best of all for an actor, he really changes during the course of this piece. I love the fact that as the drama progresses, his veneer of perfection cracks. We gradually see that he's quite arrogant and emotionally stunted."

Producer David Snodin praised Deasy, writing "The moment I started reading it, I couldn't put it down. By exploring the links between the perpetrators of abuse and their victims, I believe that Real Men provides the deepest examination of this subject in a drama to date. This piece is drenched in truth, so it can't be exploitative. Frank's writing may be dangerous and close to the bone, but it's always truthful. You get drawn into the world of these characters - you don't approve of it, but Real Men just shows you how it is."

The series was considered so-hard hitting that the Radio Times published an article on the week of the programme's broadcast, entitled A fit subject for drama?.

== Availability ==
The series has never been repeated, nor released on DVD.

== Cast ==
=== Main cast ===
- Ben Daniels as DI Matthew Fenton
- Charles Dale as DS Barry Grimes
- Ewan Stewart as Alistair Jackson
- Zoe Telford as Christina Leith
- Christine Tremarco as DS Paula Savage
- Caroline Catz as Liz Fenton
- Harry Eden as Russell Wade
- Steve John Shepherd as Brian Marshall
- Stephen Lord as Alex Collins
- Emil Marwa as DC Daniel Norbury

=== Supporting cast ===
- Jill Baker as Julie Ferguson
- Nicola Cowper as Deborah Wade
- Anthony Flanagan as James Mulgrew
- Matthew Marsh as DCI Norton
- Selva Rasalingam as Ron Dixon
- Amanda Ryan as Greta Banham
- Desmond Bayliss as Terence Sandals
- Tom Charnock as Charley Meikle
- Sally Walsh as Joanna Collins
- Pauline Jefferson as Delores Fenton
- Faye Cook as Samantha Fenton
- Ben McGawley as Simon Fenton
- Helen Kay as Angela Jackson

== Episodes ==
No.	Title	Directed by	Written by	Original release date
1	"Part 1"	Sallie Aphramain	Frank Deasy	12 March 2003
DI Matthew Fenton's determination to solve the three-year-old case of an abducted schoolboy leads him to uncover a web of systematic abuse that is threatening to destroy the lives of vulnerable children.
2	"Part 2"	Sallie Aphramain	Frank Deasy	13 March 2003
The head of care at Meadowlands children's home is brought in for questioning. DI Fenton suspects that one of the boys in the home is being abused and has to win the boy's trust to obtain proof of the perpetrator's guilt.
