= Murder of Wendy Sewell =

1973 English killing and subsequent legal case

- Wendy Sewell
- Location: Bakewell, Derbyshire, England
- Date: 12 September 1973
- Attack type: Murder
- Deaths: 1
- Victim: Wendy Sewell
- Perpetrator: Unknown
- Motive: Apparently sexual motivated
- Convicted: Stephen Downing (overturned)

On 12 September 1973, Wendy Sewell, a 32-year-old legal secretary from Bakewell, Peak District in Derbyshire was found beaten, sexually assaulted and murdered. In 1974, 17-year-old Stephen Downing was convicted of the murder. Following a campaign led by local newspaper editor Don Hale highlighting multiple breaches of legal rules and procedures in the police interrogation, Downing's conviction was overturned in 2002. The case is thought to be one of the longest miscarriages of justice in British legal history, and attracted international media attention.

Downing remains the prime and only suspect in the case, with police reinvestigations finding that all the alternative suspects suggested by Don Hale could be eliminated from inquiries. Downing, meanwhile, was the only suspect who could not be eliminated. Don Hale's book was subsequently criticised for falsehoods and inaccuracies, and police considered bringing charges against him for its contents.

When the law of double jeopardy was changed in England and Wales in 2005, allowing individuals who had previously been acquitted of a crime to be re-tried in certain circumstances, Derbyshire Police applied to the Crown Prosecution Service to re-charge Downing. However, as of July 2022, Downing has not been retried.

== History ==
=== Assault ===
Wendy Sewell was attacked, in Bakewell Cemetery, at lunchtime on 12 September 1973. A witness, Charles Carman, saw her enter the cemetery at about 12:50 pm. She was beaten around the head seven times with the handle of a pickaxe, which had caused severe head injuries and fractures to her skull. She had been sexually assaulted, with her trousers, pants, plimsolls and parts of her bra removed by her killer. When help arrived the woman was still conscious and she then tried to stand up, before falling and banging her head on a gravestone. She died from her injuries in Chesterfield Royal Hospital two days later.

=== Trial ===
The 17-year-old cemetery groundskeeper who found the body, Stephen Downing, was immediately suspected of committing the attack. He told police he wanted to wash blood from his hands, at which point he was arrested. He later told police that he had found Sewell lying on the ground, covered in blood, and that her blood got on his clothes because she shook her head. He was a virgin and had never had a girlfriend. Despite having learning difficulties and a mental age of 11, he was not cautioned and was questioned for hours without a lawyer present. Reportedly, the police did not tell Downing he was under arrest and "insisted he was merely helping them out". Officers questioning Downing shook him and pulled his hair to prevent him from going to sleep, and allegedly took bets on who would get him to confess. After several hours of this treatment, Downing agreed to sign a confession. At this point Sewell had not died, and he was only charged with the lesser crime of assault. After he confessed to the assault it was revealed that Sewell had died, and Downing's charge was elevated to murder. Downing retracted his confession soon after, claiming he was at home at the time of the attack. There was no evidence to support this claim. Downing later told his solicitor that he did not initially retract his confession because he was afraid of how his father, who had been supportive of him on learning he had confessed, would react if he admitted to lying. During his second appeal, the judges noted there was "slight psychiatric support" for Downing's explanation.

Downing's trial took place between 13 and 15 February 1974 at the Crown Court at Nottingham before Mr Justice Nield and a jury. He pleaded not guilty to murder, although he admitted to sexually assaulting Sewell as she lay in the cemetery. A forensic scientist, Norman Lee, gave evidence that the blood found on the accused could only have been present if he had been responsible for the assault. Lee described this evidence as "a textbook example ... which might be expected on the clothing of the assailant". Downing said at the trial that he had been using the murder weapon, the pickaxe handle, to break up firewood. No full transcript of the trial exists, but it is known that, in summing up, the judge drew attention to Downing's admission during the trial of having indecently assaulted Sewell as she lay injured in the cemetery. He had also only begun to claim his confession to the murder was not genuine several weeks after he was originally charged. He said he had only confessed because he thought that she had not been seriously injured and would not die.

After only one hour of deliberations, the jury found Downing guilty of murder. He was sentenced to be indefinitely detained at Her Majesty's pleasure, with a stipulation that he should serve a minimum of seventeen years.

Claiming he was in an innocent prisoner's dilemma, Downing was unable to be paroled, as he did not admit to the crime. He was classified as "In Denial of Murder" and therefore ineligible for parole under English law.

=== The first appeal ===
A witness was found who said she saw Downing leaving the cemetery, and at that time she also saw Wendy Sewell alive and unharmed. Downing applied for leave to appeal on the grounds he had a new witness.

On 25 October 1974, the Court of Appeal heard the grounds for appeal and reached the conclusion that the witness' evidence of seeing Wendy Sewell walking towards the back of the consecrated chapel was unreliable due to some fully grown trees obstructing her line of sight. The witness had also only come forward months after the conviction and after police had previously visited her house to ask if she had seen anything. The court felt that her evidence was not credible and secure enough to allow an appeal against the conviction. After the appeal was rejected, the case slipped into obscurity for many years.

During the Derbyshire Police's re-investigation in 2002, this witness was re-interviewed and accompanied back to the cemetery location. She reaffirmed that the fully grown trees, which have since been felled, would have obstructed her line of sight. She also revealed the knowledge that she is, and was at the time, short sighted. The witness, who was 15 years old at the time of the murder, was unable to give an adequate reason for why she came forward with her original evidence.

=== Campaign ===
Stephen Downing continued to deny committing the murder so his family attempted to get support for another retrial, saying "we just want him home". In 1994, they wrote to the local newspaper, the Matlock Mercury. The editor, Don Hale, took up the case and along with Downing's family ran a campaign. As part of the campaign, attention was drawn to ongoing accusations of Sewell being promiscuous – including being dubbed the "Bakewell Tart" – in order to suggest that one of her lovers may have been responsible.

Hale found that the murder weapon, a pickaxe handle, was on display at Derby Museum. He organised his own modern forensic examination to be made of it. Mr Downing's fingerprints were not found although there was a palm print from an as yet unidentified person. However, the print could have come to be on the handle at any point in time, with it being contaminated over the years it was stored. It had not been stored in protected conditions and had been handled by countless individuals, meaning the print could have been entirely unrelated to the crime. The blood spatter evidence was likewise reexamined, and it was shown that the blood on Downing's trousers had likely already clotted when he knelt in it, suggesting Sewell was attacked some time before Downing made contact with her. Hale also found several witnesses who stated that they had seen Wendy Sewell alive after Downing had left the cemetery, and others who recalled seeing a second man fleeing the scene with blood on his clothes. Many of these witnesses had approached Derbyshire Police during the original investigation but had been ignored.

In 1997, Downing applied to the Criminal Cases Review Commission (CCRC) asking them to review his case. As part of its review the CCRC instructed an independent forensic expert to reexamine the blood evidence. Based on scientific advances which had taken place in the years since Downing's conviction, he found Norman Lee's conclusion that the blood-spatter patterns on Downing's clothes were only consistent with guilt to be flawed. The report submitted to the CCRC stated that the blood evidence was not conclusive and was equally consistent with Downing's version of events as it was the prosecution's. The CCRC also took statements from officers involved in the investigation about the methods they had used to extract a confession. Ultimately the CCRC concluded there were "significant deficiencies" in the evidence against Downing and referred his case back to the Court of Appeal.

=== The second appeal ===
During the second appeal, held on 15 January 2002, the Court of Appeal accepted many of the reasons that were put forward by Hale and others for believing the conviction was unsafe. Julian Bevan, counsel for the Crown, accepted that Downing's confession should not have been allowed to go before a jury. The confession was deemed unsafe because Downing had been questioned for eight hours, during which the police shook him and pulled his hair to keep him awake; because he was not formally cautioned that what he said might be used in evidence against him; and because he was not given a solicitor. The court also held that the blood-spatter patterns were equally consistent with innocence as with guilt after hearing evidence from two forensic scientists, one instructed by the CCRC and one by Downing's solicitors.

Lord Justice Pill said that the Court of Appeal did not have to consider whether Downing had proved that he was innocent, but whether the original conviction was fair – "The question for [the Court of Appeal’s] consideration is whether the conviction is safe and not whether the accused is guilty". What the defence had proved was that there was reasonable doubt about the "reliability of the confessions made in 1973". His Lordship said: "The court cannot be sure the confessions are reliable. It follows that the conviction is unsafe. The conviction is quashed."

== Later events ==
=== Police reinvestigation ===
Following the Court of Appeal overturning Stephen Downing's conviction, the Derbyshire Police reinvestigated the murder under the name Operation Noble. During 2002, they interviewed 1,600 witnesses, at an estimated cost of £500,000. Downing himself provided his fingerprints for elimination purposes, but refused to be interviewed on the advice of his lawyers. A year after the conviction was overturned, in February 2003, Derbyshire Police revealed the findings of their reinvestigation of the murder. 22 other possible suspects had been investigated, many of whom had been suggested by Don Hale during his campaign, and in his book Town Without Pity. One of the alternative suspects was Downing's father, who had been driving the bus that dropped Sewell near her workplace on the morning she was assaulted. All of these alternative suspects were cleared of any possibility of having murdered Wendy Sewell. Downing, meanwhile, was the only suspect who could not be eliminated. Jim Walker, a forensic scientist with Kent Police, reviewed the blood spatter evidence and concluded that: "The pattern of blood staining on Stephen Downing's clothing supports the assertion that Stephen Downing battered Mrs Sewell prior to handling and kneeling by her body". The police had wanted to question Downing about three confessions he made to the murder since his release from prison, including one recorded on audio tape, but he refused to comply. A woman who he was in a relationship with, Christine Smith, had taped him confessing during an argument, and he was also alleged to have confessed to his father on two occasions in 2002 after his release. Downing stated in response that he had been manipulated by Smith and had confessed "to shut her up and keep her happy". Although he had refused to be interviewed for the reinvestigation, Downing issued a formal complaint after the findings were announced, saying: "They said that they would do a thorough investigation into the matter - they have not done". An independent committee set up to oversee the police investigation later concluded that the inquiry had been completely fair and that they were satisfied with the integrity and rigour of the investigation. Downing's solicitor was among those on the committee and himself concluded that the investigation had been fair.

After failing to link any other person with the murder, and unable to eliminate Downing as the suspect, the police declared the case closed and said they were not looking for anyone else. Even though Downing remained the prime suspect, under the "double jeopardy" rules in place at the time a suspect could not be re-arrested and charged with a crime they had previously been acquitted of. The police said that, had the law been different, they would have applied to the Crown Prosecution Service (CPS) to again charge Downing with the murder. The findings of the investigation led to public doubts over whether he should have been released.

=== Complaints against Hale and charges considered ===
Hale's book, Town Without Pity, came in for considerable criticism at this time, and it was accused of inaccuracy. A police report criticised Hale's book, saying that an analysis of it had shown discrepancies in his story. The man who wrote the report, Deputy Chief Constable Bob Wood, commented: "There are a number of anomalies contained within Mr Hale's documentation, and within Town Without Pity, that, taken in isolation, have the potential to detract the reader from the facts surrounding the case". The report further added: "A number of witnesses to whom Mr Hale attributed personal comment have told officers they have never spoken to him. Many witnesses who recalled speaking to Mr Hale say his written version is not their recollection of what was said". The report highlighted that speculation in the book that Sewell was meeting an illicit boyfriend at the time of her death was incorrect, and said that it was wrong of Hale to draw significance to Sewell's "missing bag" and claims that her personal effects were never found, since they had actually been returned to her husband shortly after the murder and never went missing. Police further investigated the book after complaints were raised, considering whether Hale could be prosecuted for its contents. However, it was announced in September 2003 that Hale would not be charged.

=== 2004 arrest ===
In March 2004, Stephen Downing was arrested over allegations of intimidation, having apparently intimidated a female witness in the case. His arrest came four days before the screening of the BBC dramatisation of the case titled "In Denial of Murder", which concluded that Downing may have in fact committed the crime. As a result, Don Hale complained about the programme. The producers said that it was a more balanced and accurate account of the case than Hale's book Town Without Pity.

=== Double jeopardy law change ===
In 2005, the law on double jeopardy was changed so as to allow those who had previously been acquitted of murder to be re-tried if new and compelling evidence was found. This led to police to apply to the CPS to charge Downing once more. However, the CPS decided that the new evidence presented was not compelling enough for a retrial. Sewell's widower David attempted to get the CPS to reconsider their ruling. Downing declined to comment.

=== 2008 conviction ===
In October 2008, Downing was convicted of wearing police clothing in public. He had been arrested in Buxton while dressed as a police officer, which, it was concluded, was "likely to deceive the public". His jacket had the name of Downing's freelance photographic company advertised on the back. He had worn the clothing on previous occasions, and he was fined a total of £1,062.

== Yorkshire Ripper theory ==
In January 2014, Chris Clark, a former detective investigating 16 unsolved murders and possible links to the 'Yorkshire Ripper' Peter Sutcliffe, obtained a pathology report which he claimed was buried by the police in 1973 within a few days of the attack on Wendy Sewell. He said it would have completely contradicted the so-called confession, exonerated Downing and prevented a miscarriage of justice, because he said that it revealed that she had bruising on her neck and so must have been strangled. The Home Office said that any new evidence would be sent to the police, and said that any evidence of police misconduct would be referred to the Independent Police Complaints Commission. Derbyshire Police dismissed the claims, saying that the murder had been thoroughly reinvestigated and this revealed that only Downing could not be eliminated as a suspect. They also stated that there was no evidence to suggest that Peter Sutcliffe was involved. Sutcliffe committed almost all of his attacks in west Yorkshire, some 40 miles from Bakewell, except for two attacks he committed in Manchester, which is also about 40 miles from Bakewell.

=== Yorkshire Ripper: The Secret Murders ===
In 2022, a documentary on Clark's book about Peter Sutcliffe's supposed links to other murders, titled Yorkshire Ripper: The Secret Murders, was aired. It claimed that Sutcliffe could be linked to the attack and that Downing must have been innocent, because he said in his confession that he had picked up the pickaxe handle he used to attack Sewell from the graveyard store, and it had actually not been kept there. It was suggested, therefore, that Downing had in fact not accessed the tool. However, Downing had actually said at his trial that he had been using the murder weapon that afternoon to break up firewood.

== Stephen Downing ==
Stephen Downing worked for the local council as a gardener in the Bakewell cemetery where Wendy Sewell was murdered. He was 17 years old, with a reading age of an 11-year-old, when he was tried and found guilty of the murder of Sewell. He served 27 years in jail. He had to change prison eight times due to being assaulted by fellow prisoners as a sex offender. He was released from Littlehey Prison in Cambridgeshire in 2001.

Downing's release was reported by the BBC as being hailed as "a triumph for campaigning journalism... and an end to one of the worst miscarriages of justice in English legal history." Downing was reported as receiving celebrity treatment upon his release. He initially found employment as a trainee chef in a Bakewell restaurant, using the training he had been given whilst in prison. After his exoneration, Downing received an interim compensation payment of £250,000, as well as a final undisclosed sum said to be "less than" £500,000.

== Popular culture ==
The case was featured in the 2004 BBC drama In Denial of Murder in which Jason Watkins played Stephen Downing and Caroline Catz played Wendy Sewell.

== See also ==
- List of miscarriage of justice cases in the United Kingdom
- Wrongful conviction of Peter Sullivan – later surpassed Downing's conviction as Britain's longest miscarriage of justice

== Bibliography ==
- Hale, Don (2002) Town Without Pity (Century) ISBN 0-7126-1530-X
- Lomax, Scott (October 2009). "Chapter 12 - Wendy Sewell: Bakewell 1973". Unsolved murders in and around Derbyshire. Barnsley: Pen and Sword Books. ISBN 978-1-7834-0887-0.
- Welch, Claire (2012). "Wendy Sewell". Unsolved Crimes: From the Case Files of The People and Daily Mirror. Sparkford: Haynes Publishing. pp. 70–73. ISBN 978-0-857331-75-5.
