= Britain's Biggest Warship =

- Genre: Documentary
- Written by: Chris Terrill
- Directed by: Chris Terrill
- Narrated by: Caroline Catz
- Country of origin: United Kingdom
- Original language: English
- No. of seasons: 2
- No. of episodes: 6

Production
- Executive producers: Christine Hall, Alan Clements
- Camera setup: Chris Terrill
- Running time: 60 minutes
- Production companies: Uppercut Films; STV Studios

Original release
- Network: BBC Two
- Release: 15 April 2018 – 10 November 2019

Britain's Biggest Warship is a British documentary television series about the early sea trials of the Royal Navy's new flagship aircraft carrier, HMS Queen Elizabeth, first broadcast on BBC Two in 2018.

- Crewing Up - 15 April 2018
- In at the Deep End - 22 April 2018
- Out with the Old, in with the New - 29 April 2018

'Britain's Biggest Warship: Goes to Sea' is the second series in the brand. This three part series shown in the autumn of 2019 tells the story of HMS Queen Elizabeth's four-month deployment to the US to test the F35b Lightning Stealth fighter for the first time.

- Let Go All Lines - 27 October 2019
- Don't Feed the Birds - 3 November 2019
- Manhattan Ahoy! - 10 November 2019
