= The Nightmare Worlds of H. G. Wells =

- Genre: Drama; Horror
- Created by: Graham Duff
- Based on: Short stories by H.G. Wells
- Starring: Ray Winstone
- Composers: Elizabeth Fraser; Damon Reece
- Country of origin: United Kingdom
- Original language: English
- No. of series: 1
- No. of episodes: 4

Production
- Executive producers: Graham Duff; Murray Ferguson; Petra Fried; Matt Jarvis; Jo McClellan
- Producer: Charlie Leech
- Cinematography: Anna Valdez-Hanks
- Running time: 23 minutes
- Production company: Clerkenwell Films

Original release
- Network: Sky Arts
- Release: 28 January – 4 February 2016

The Nightmare Worlds of H. G. Wells is a 2016 horror-fantasy television miniseries, based on short stories by H. G. Wells. The four-part series of 23-minute episodes was commissioned and broadcast by Sky Arts.

== Plot ==
Every episode opens (and closes) with Wells, who introduces a topic and narrates a story about it.

=== Episode 1: The Late Mr. Elvesham ===
Young and penniless medical student Edward Eden is approached by old and wealthy Egbert Elvesham, who doesn't have an heir and is looking for someone to bequeath his fortune, provided they take his name. Elvesham tricks Eden into drinking a potion, which makes them exchange their bodies during the night. While Elvesham enjoys the joys of the young body, Eden is trapped in the old body (and in the identity of its previous owner), and looks for his revenge.

=== Episode 2: The Devotee of Art ===
Mediocre artist Alec Harringay is trying to depict St Catherine for a submission to the Royal Academy, but he is never satisfied with his work. His painting becomes suddenly alive and lures him into a dreadful pact: being able to paint a masterpiece in exchange oforhis soul. This event radically transforms Harringay, who eventually kills his wife, Isabel, and suffers the consequences.

=== Episode 3: The Moth ===
Entomologists Prof. Pawkins and Dr. Hapley take pleasure in discrediting each other's work. When Pawkins dies, Hapley loses interest in his research. Shortly afterwards he is haunted by a moth with the face of his old enemy. He becomes obsessed that the moth is a reincarnated Hapley taking revenge, but he is not believed and is thought mad.

=== Episode 4: The Purple Pileus ===
Shopkeeper James Coombes constantly argues with his wife Eveline and her friends Jennie and Clarence. When things become too tense, he wanders outside, first meditating on how to kill her, then choosing to kill himself, by eating what he believes are poisonous purple mushrooms, but they are revealed to be hallucinogenic. After an overdose, he starts consuming a calculated amount to improve his humour in daily life. Eveline eventually eats all the mushrooms by mistake, overdosing herself with dreadful consequences.

== Cast ==
Ray Winstone as H. G. Wells

=== Episode 1 ===
- Camilla Beeput as Young Woman
- Graham Duff as Doctor
- Michael Gambon as Egbert Elvesham
- Paul Putner as Harris
- Luke Treadaway as Edward Eden

=== Episode 2 ===
- Brid Brennan as Nurse
- Leticia Dolera as St. Catherine
- Johnny Flynn as Alec Harringay
- Antonia Thomas as Isabel Harringay

=== Episode 3 ===
- Amelda Brown as Hapley's Housekeeper
- Tom GoodmanasHill as Father Morton
- Rupert Graves as Dr. Hapley
- James Wilby as Professor Pawkins

=== Episode 4 ===
- Leanne Best as Eveline Coombes
- Mercedes Grower as Jennie
- Shaun Parkes as James Coombes
- Stewart Wright as Clarence Clint

== Production ==
Wells wrote the script of an abandoned film version of Mr Elvesham (as The New Faust) for Alexander Korda in the 1930s. Filming for the series took place at West London Film Studios. Writer and executive producer Graham Duff also appeared in the first episode.

== Episodes ==
No.	Title	Written by	Original release date
1	"The Late Mr Elvesham"	Graham Duff	28 January 2016
2	"The Devotee of Art"	Graham Duff	28 January 2016
3	"The Moth"	Graham Duff	4 February 2016
4	"The Purple Pileus"	Graham Duff	4 February 2016

== See also ==
- The Infinite Worlds of H. G. Wells - a similar 2001 anthology
- H. G. Wells bibliography
