= Wild West (TV series) =

British television sitcom

- Genre: Sitcom; Dark comedy
- Created by: Simon Nye
- Directed by: Jonathan Gershfield; Juliet May
- Starring: Dawn French; Catherine Tate; Bill Bailey; David Bradley; Stewart Wright; Sean Foley; Richard Mylan; Robin Weaver; Anne-Marie Duff
- Country of origin: United Kingdom
- Original language: English
- No. of series: 2
- No. of episodes: 12

Production
- Running time: 30 minutes

Original release
- Network: BBC One
- Release: 22 October 2002 – 13 April 2004

Wild West is a British television dark comedy sitcom created by Simon Nye, which aired from 22 October 2002 to 13 April 2004. The series was set in the Cornish hamlet of St Gweep (filmed on location in Portloe), observing the strange goings-on in the local community. It stars an ensemble cast, led by Dawn French and Catherine Tate as shop owners Mary Trewednack and Angela Phillips.

The first series of the sitcom aired on prime-time BBC1, where its eccentricities met with a poor critical and popular response, but a second series was commissioned, and both series have received retrospective praise.

== Plot ==
The action centres around Angela Phillips and Mary Trewednack, a couple who run the local town store and post office. Although the two are out lesbians, Mary comments at one point that they are only a couple because they were the only two people in town who weren't already in a relationship when they met. Some plots of first series episodes revolve around both of them pursuing romances with men and the jealousy the other partner experiences. By the second series, all mentions of a lesbian relationship are completely dropped, including a recurring gag during the opening credits that showed them in bed together. This is resolved in the final episode of the show.

Each episode centers on a new situation that has come into the lives of the characters and how they deal with it, generally with a focus on the different ways in which Mary and Angela meddle in everyone's lives.

== Cast ==
- Dawn French as Mary Trewednack
- Catherine Tate as Angela Phillips
- Anne-Marie Duff as Holly Hunteman (series 1), owner of the local witchcraft centre
- Robin Weaver as Holly Hunteman (series 2)
- Richard Mylan as Harry King, a young hippie
- David Bradley as "Old Jake" Trethowan, who runs the local boat tour
- Sean Foley as Jeff Dax, a swinger and sexual deviant who owns the local pub
- Stewart Wright as PC Alan Allen, a somewhat bumbling policeman who becomes Mary's major romantic interest in series 2
- Bill Bailey as Doug
- Katie Cotterell as WPC Smothers (series 2)

=== Recurring cast ===
- Caroline Parker as Daphne Dax, Jeff's Deaf wife
- Steve Jacobs as an unnamed local

== Episodes ==
=== Series 1 ===
| No. | Title | Airdate | Summary |
|---|---|---|---|
| 1 | One Home Good, Two Homes Bad | 22 October 2002 | Huge bags of Tupperware from a shipwreck wash up on the beach in St Gweep and the locals are whipped into a scavenging frenzy, meanwhile Harry decides to lead a campaign against people who buy up property in the town for use as holiday homes. |
| 2 | Fear of Bungee | 29 October 2002 | A local bungee jump is set up temporarily in the town and the locals are wary, Angela is determined to jump – although with her "lucky charm". Mary takes on the task of handling vandalism in the town. |
| 3 | Swingers | 5 November 2002 | The whole town is aware of Jeff's secret swingers parties at the pub, Mary decides to go along to one, Angela sends the police in to perform a raid. |
| 4 | Tin, Tin, Tin | 19 November 2002 | Angela finds herself elected "power cut czar" by PC Alan when the town's electricity supply is cut off for several days. Jake has the only generator and charges exorbitant prices for batteries, use of televisions, computers and showers. Mary successfully plays matchmaker with Holly and Harry, but then must work to split them up. |
| 5 | A Problem Shared Is A Problem Doubled | 26 November 2002 | Mary gets her hands on a body piercing kit and proceeds to offer piercings to anyone and everyone – even though it did not come with any instructions. Angela is reminded of the day she had to run at school in her underwear, when her former headmistress shows up in St Gweep. |
| 6 | Un, Deu, Tri, Figo, Quiggly | 3 December 2002 | Holly embarks on a mission to raise awareness and knowledge of the Cornish language while a Londoner seduces Angela and wants to take her back to the city. |

=== Series 2 ===
| No. | Title | Airdate | Summary |
|---|---|---|---|
| 1 | The Exploding Car | 12 March 2004 | A trio of roughhousing teens are terrorizing the locals, and as a result their car is found to have been burnt to a crisp. PC Alan investigates while Mary sets her sights on him romantically. |
| 2 | Magical Horses | 19 March 2004 | Three beautiful white horses seemingly appear from nowhere on the local beach; Old Jake is given custody of them while PC Alan tries to locate their proper owner. Mary concocts a story about the horses for the local press that brings tourists into town. |
| 3 | Angela Learns to Drive | 26 March 2004 | Angela's father, from whom she desperately seeks approval, is arriving into town. She's promised to give him a driving tour: just one problem – she doesn't know how to drive. The locals attempt to teach her in just 10 days. Meanwhile, the romance between PC Alan and Mary heats up as they try to find a place to consummate their relationship. |
| 4 | Cornish Flu | 2 April 2004 | Everyone in town (except Angela and Mary) comes down with a serious illness. The timing could not be worse as it's holiday season and money-spending tourists are coming in droves. The duo decide to try to take over everyone's duties, including running the bar, witchcraft centre and boat tour. In the meantime Mary tries to squeeze in one last sex session with PC Alan before he leaves on vacation. |
| 5 | The Film Crew | 9 April 2004 | A television crew comes in to film a movie, and the locals get into an uproar about the stereotypical depiction of Cornish people (all the while living up to them). Mary attempts to bully her way into getting Angela a part in the film. Meanwhile, Old Jake is in for a surprise when a daughter he never knew he had arrives in town. |
| 6 | Holly Loses Faith in Witchcraft | 13 April 2004 | Holly begins to feel depressed and lonely over being single, and witchcraft doesn't seem to help. Meanwhile, Mary and Angela realise they've been running the store together for 15 years. However Mary is worried because Angela, desperate to be in a relationship, has taken in a new boyfriend who is using her. |
