= Zoe Telford =

English actress

- Telford in 2025
- Born: 1973 (age 52–53); Norwich, Norfolk, England
- Education: Italia Conti Academy of Theatre Arts
- Occupation: Actress
- Years active: 1993–present
- Children: 2
- Awards: Edinburgh International Film Festival; Special Commendation; Greyhawk, 2014

Zoe Telford is an English actress.

== Early life and education ==
Telford was born in Norwich, England. She started training as a dancer at a very young age and continued until she was in her 20s. She attended the Italia Conti Academy of Theatre Arts. Her first break was on the show The Bill, a police drama, in 1993.

== Career ==
After guesting in The Bill, Telford appeared as a guest on several British TV shows before her first major role in the mini-series The Last Train (1999). One of her first recognisable works was in the first season of Channel 4's Teachers (2001) in which she played Maggie, a police officer and girlfriend to the character Simon Casey, played by Andrew Lincoln.

In the TV movie Men Only (2001), she played Alice, a nurse who was gang-raped by a group of men known to her and with whom she had flirted, played by, among others, Stephen Moyer and Martin Freeman. She played the social worker Christina Leith in Real Men (2003), a two part TV drama that tackled the subject of paedophilia. Telford appeared as Eva Braun in the 2003 Emmy-nominated Hitler: The Rise of Evil opposite Robert Carlyle. The TV movie was broadcast in the US on CBS with some controversy as it reportedly "likened the nation's acceptance of the Bush administration's pre-emptive strike on Iraq to the climate of fear that allowed Hitler to prosper". Her screen time was short since the film focused more on the events leading up to the Final Solution.

In Agatha Christie's Poirot's Death on the Nile (2004), Telford played Rosalie Otterbourne, one of the cruise passengers alongside Emily Blunt, James Fox, and David Suchet. She played Alison Jackman, a young trainee at the fictional PR firm of Prentiss McCabe headed by Stephen Fry in the BBC's Absolute Power (2003–2005), and trauma doctor Jane Cameron in The Golden Hour (2005), a four part ITV miniseries.

In 2006 Telford played Emily Trefusis in Agatha Christie's Marple's The Sittaford Mystery, produced jointly by Granada and WGBH-Boston. The show was broadcast in the US as part of the PBS Mystery! anthology series and marked her first collaboration with Laurence Fox. She was also in three different movies in the same year: Beau Brummell: This Charming Man, The Painted Veil (starring Naomi Watts), and The Truth (starring Elizabeth McGovern). She played Abigail Thomas, Assistant Private Secretary to the Sovereign, in the eight episode ITV series The Palace (2008). The show was originally conceived as an answer to The West Wing but underwent several script changes and, according to Telford, "became a very different thing to what it originally started out as". In 2008 she worked for the first time with Juliet Stevenson in the three part ITV series Place of Execution; the show was broadcast in the US in the following year as part of the PBS Mystery! anthology.

In 2009 Telford appeared in several other procedural dramas including Law & Order: UK (2009), the second season of Criminal Justice (2009) where she played the defence barrister for Maxine Peake’s character Julie, and Collision (2009) which was broadcast in the US under the PBS Masterpiece Contemporary. In the same year she appeared as a freelance tabloid reporter in two episodes of the comedy series The Thick of It (2009). In 2010 she appeared in Foyle's War (2010), shown in the US under the PBS Mystery! series. She also appeared in Episodes 2 and 3 of the first season of the BBC's Sherlock (2010) as Sarah, a physician colleague and love interest of Dr. John Watson, played by her Men Only co-star Martin Freeman. Telford's appearance as Freya Carlisle in Lewis (2011) reunited her with Juliet Stevenson and Laurence Fox; while her appearance as Eva Storr in the BBC's Room at the Top (2012) reunited her with her Criminal Justice co-star Maxine Peake. She played the newly created character Claire Sutton, a policy adviser, in the 2013 remake of Yes, Prime Minister.

Telford won a Special Commendation Award for her role in the film Greyhawk at the 2014 Edinburgh International Film Festival, where the film premiered. She plays Paula, a beleaguered housewife who helps Mal, a blind veteran, find his dog.

She appeared in the Series 18 opening episodes of Silent Witness (2015) as DCI Jane de Freitas. Her role as Bella Cross, the daughter of one of the main suspects in the first series of Unforgotten (2015), reunited her with Nicola Walker, her former co-star in The Last Train. She played the tragic Clara Haber in the first series of National Geographic's Genius – Einstein (2017). She appeared in other British TV series including Death in Paradise (2018) as Michelle Devaux, a professional poker player, and Grantchester (2019) as Jean Simms, Head of the Computing Department at the University of Cambridge, set in the 1950s. She played Sarah Bradford, the missing wife of DI David Bradford in the TV series London Kills (2019), produced by Acorn TV and acquired by the BBC for 2020 release in the UK.

== Personal life ==
Telford has a son and a daughter. She lives in Oxfordshire.

== Filmography ==
=== Film ===
Year	Title	Role	Notes
2002	Nine 1/2 Minutes	Heather	Short film
2005	Match Point	Samantha	
2005	Deuce Bigalow: European Gigolo	Lily	
2006	The Truth	Blossom	
2006	The Painted Veil	Leona	
2007	The Waiting Room	Jem	
2009	Beyond the Pole	Melissa	
2011	The Child	Zoe	Short film
2012	Ashes	Sophie	
2012	Defining Fay	Fay Hahn	Short film
2014	Greyhawk	Paula	
2016	Tuesday	Amy	Short film
2017	Void and Method	Julia	Short film
2022	Christmas On Mistletoe Farm	Miss Carson	
TBA	Two Neighbors	TBA	Post-production

=== Television ===
Year	Title	Role	Notes
1993	The Bill	Helen Shaw	Series 9; episode 7: "Rainy Days and Mondays"
1995	Soldier Soldier	Chloe Green	Series 5; episode 8: "The Army Game"
1998	Peak Practice	Sarah O'Shaughnessy	Series 6; episode 1: "All Fall Down"
1998	Invasion: Earth	Louise Reynolds	Mini-series; episode 3: "Only the Dead"
1999	The Last Train	Roe Germaine	Mini-series; episodes 1–6
2000	Second Sight	Sandra Pearson	Episodes 5 & 6: "Kingdom of the Blind: Parts One & Two"
2001	Teachers	Maggie	Series 1; episodes 1–8
2001	Men Only	Alice	Television film
2003	Real Men	Christina Leith	Television film
2003	Hitler: The Rise of Evil	Eva Braun	Mini-series; episodes 1 & 2
2003–2005	Absolute Power	Alison Jackman	Series 1 & 2; 12 episodes
2004	Born and Bred	Rita Lennox	Series 3; episode 4: "Thick as Thieves"
2004	Agatha Christie's Poirot	Rosalie Otterbourne	Series 9; episode 3: "Death on the Nile"
2004	Cutting It	Dulcima Goodrush	Series 3; episode 2
2005	Twisted Tales	Davina	Episode 1: "Txt Msg Rcvd"
2005	The Golden Hour	Jane Cameron	Mini-series; episodes 1–4
2006	Agatha Christie's Marple	Emily Trefusis	Series 2; episode 4: "The Sittaford Mystery"
2006	Beau Brummell: This Charming Man	Julia	Television film
2006	Afterlife	Ruth	Series 2; episode 3: "Lullaby"
2008	The Palace	Abigail Thomas	Episodes 1–8
2008	Place of Execution	Nicola Curry	Mini-series; episodes 1–3
2009	Law & Order: UK	Sara Fraser	Series 2; episode 6: "Honour Bound"
2009	Criminal Justice	Anna Klein	Series 2; episodes 1–5
2009	Collision	Sandra Rampton	Mini-series; episodes 1, 3 & 4
2009	The Thick of It	Marianne Swift	Series 3; episodes 2 & 7
2010	Foyle's War	Lucy Jones	Series 6; episode 2: "Killing Time"
2010	Ashes to Ashes	Louise Gardiner	Series 3; episode 4
2010	Sherlock	Sarah Sawyer	Series 1; episodes 2 & 3: "The Blind Banker" & "The Great Game"
2011	Lewis	Freya Carlisle	Series 5; episode 1: "Old, Unhappy, Far Off Things"
2012	Room at the Top	Eva Storr	Mini-series; episodes 1 & 2
2013	Yes, Prime Minister	Claire Sutton	Series 1; episodes 1–6
2013	Jo	Christina Sittler	Mini-series; episode 7: "The Opera"
2013	Love & Marriage	Michelle Paradise	Episodes 1–6
2015	Silent Witness	DCI Jane De Freitas	Series 18; episodes 1 & 2: "Sniper's Nest: Parts 1 & 2"
2015	Unforgotten	Bella Cross	Series 1; episodes 1 & 3–6
2017	Genius	Clara Haber	Series 1; episodes 6 & 7: "Einstein: Chapters Six & Seven"
2018	Death in Paradise	Melanie Devaux	Series 7; episode 2: "The Stakes Are High"
2018	Kiss Me First	Tracey	Mini-series; episode 6: "You Can Never Go Home"
2019	Grantchester	Jean Simms	Series 4; episode 3
2019	London Kills	Sarah Bradford	Series 2; episode 5: "Captive"
2020	Save Me	Delia Corman-Clyde	Series 2; episode 2
2021	Agatha Raisin	Sadie Tamworthy	Series 4; episode 1: "Kissing Christmas Goodbye"
2022	Meet the Richardsons	Dr Maxwell	Series 3; episodes 2, 6 & 8
2022	Brassic	Mrs King	Series 4; episode 6: "Murder Mystery"
2022	Litvinenko	Ingrid Campbell	Mini-series; episode 3
2023	Vera	Juliet Branagh (Vera's cousin)	Series 12; episode 4: "The Darkest Evening"
2023	Mrs Sidhu Investigates	Bree Hamilton	Episode 3: "Killer App"
2023	The Lazarus Project	Kitty Gray	Series 2; 6 episodes
2023	Red Eye	Amber Hurst	Series 1; episodes 1–3
2024	Showtrial	Helen McGuire	Series 2; episodes 1–5
2025	Silent Witness	Jane De Freitas	Series 28; episodes 3 & 4: "Homecoming: Parts 1 & 2"
2025	Malpractice	Kate McAllister	Series 2
TBA	Army of Shadows		Upcoming series

=== Video games ===
Year	Title	Role	Notes
2014	Dragon Age: Inquisition	Sidony the Necromancer / Nana / Redcliffe Villager (voice)	
2015	Dragon Age: Inquisition – Trespasser	Orlesian Noblewoman (voice)	
2017	Mass Effect: Andromeda	Foster Addison (voice)	
2021	Zombieland: Headshot Fever	Zombies (voice)	
