= Stewart Wright =

English actor

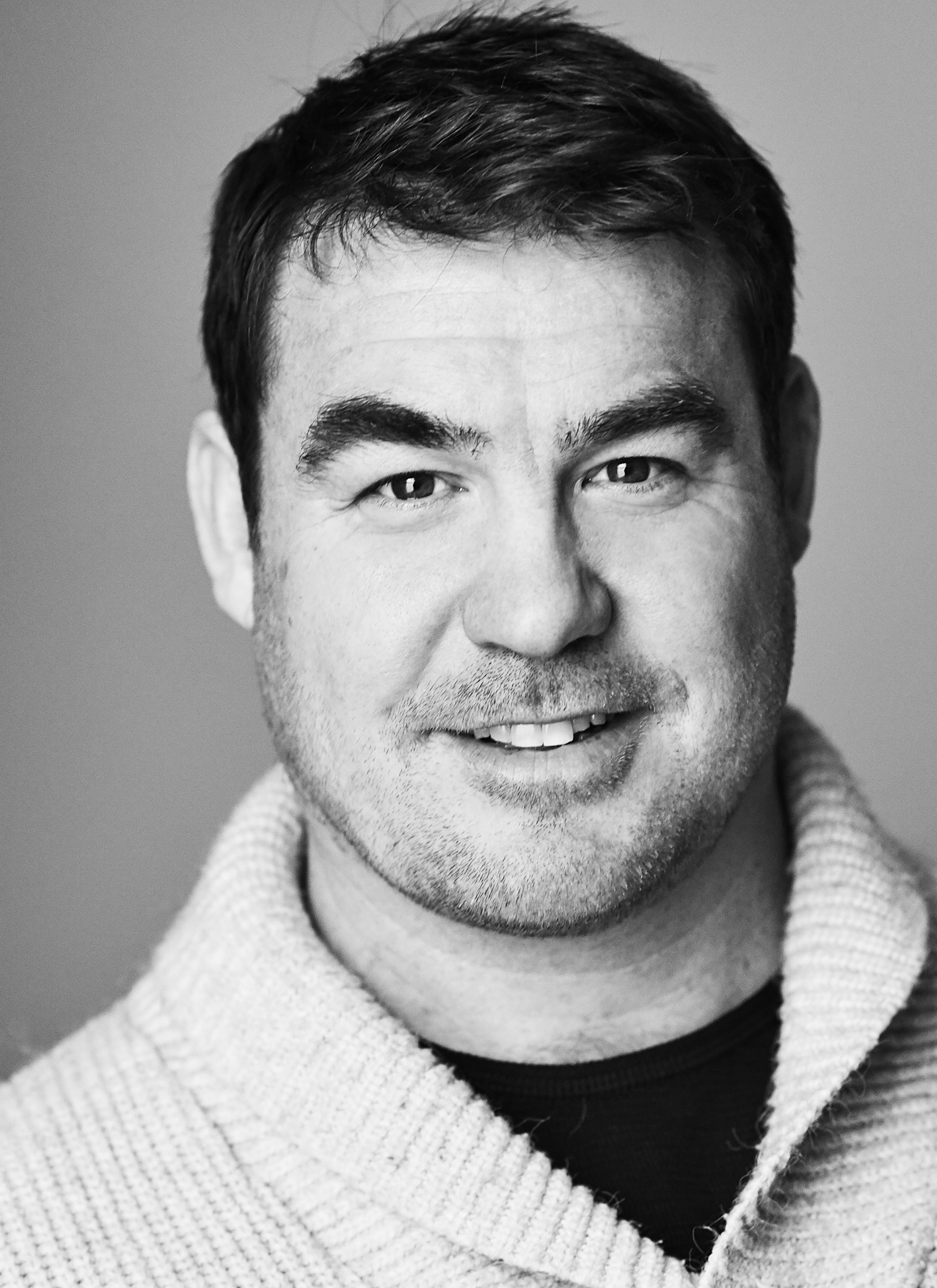
- Born: Stewart Alec Weatherley Wright; 12 January 1974 (age 52); Hammersmith, London, England
- Education: Royal Central School of Speech and Drama
- Occupation: Actor
- Years active: 1996–present
- Spouse: Celia Wright
- Children: 2

Stewart Wright (born 12 January 1974) is an English film, television and stage actor.

Wright started appearing on screen in 1997, after graduating from the Royal Central School of Speech and Drama. His breakthrough came in 1999 playing the role of Nick Levick in award-winning BBC mockumentary series People Like Us. Among his television credits are Black Books, Smack the Pony, Rescue Me, Wild West, Doc Martin, Bonkers, Love and Marriage and I Want My Wife Back. His film work includes Bridget Jones's Diary, Ali G Indahouse, A Good Year, Nativity 3: Dude, Where's My Donkey? and Bollywood film Jungle Cry.

== Early life ==
Wright was born in 1974 in Hammersmith, London, the son of two doctors. He attended Wellington College, Berkshire in the early 1990s where his passion for rugby led to his captaining the Wellington College 1st XV, going on to captain Martin Corry for Surrey Rugby Football Union Under 18s. Wright went on to complete a BA in Acting at the Royal Central School of Speech and Drama graduating in 1996. Wright relocated to Bristol in 2005, where he now lives with his family. After his work began to dry up due to the impact of the COVID-19 pandemic on the entertainment industry, Wright now works as a delivery driver for Deliveroo in order to provide for his family.

== Career ==
Film and television

Wright has played a wide variety of roles in film and TV for over twenty years, since his debut in Fierce Creatures, starring John Cleese and Jamie Lee Curtis.

His breakthrough came playing Nick Levick in the award-winning mockumentary series People Like Us in 1999. Since then he has starred in other acclaimed comedies including Black Books, Smack the Pony and Bridget Jones's Diary. He played the lead role of Eddie Chisolm alongside Sally Phillips in the BBC comedy drama Rescue Me, written by David Nicholls, and starred opposite Dawn French and Catherine Tate in BBC sitcom Wild West. For two series, he was Martin Clunes' foil, PC Mark Mylow, in the worldwide hit Doc Martin. In October 2019 his character was brought back for a one-off special. He went on to star in Love and Marriage, alongside Ashley Jensen, Alison Steadman and Celia Imrie. He has acted in a number of television dramas such as Armadillo, The Nightmare Worlds of H. G. Wells and Dirty Filthy Love, working alongside Michael Sheen, Shirley Henderson, Ray Winstone and Stephen Rea. In 2019 he worked with Steve McQueen playing Mr Baines in the Education episode of the critically acclaimed and multi award-winning series Small Axe for BBC/Amazon.

Wright's film work includes British comedies Bridget Jones's Diary and Ali G Indahouse, as well as reuniting with Martin Clunes to star as Uncle Henry in the improvised comedy Nativity 3: Dude, Where's My Donkey? He plays a central role in Bollywood film Jungle Cry, which premiered at Cannes in 2019. The film tells the real-life story of a group of Indian street kids who surprised the world in 2007 when they came to the UK and won the junior Rugby World Cup. He plays Paul Walsh, the man who inspired the team to play. Wright has gone on to become an Ambassador for Walsh's charity, the Jungle Crows Foundation.

Theatre

In 2001 Wright became recognised as a stage actor after playing Frank Lubey in the Royal National Theatre production of All My Sons, directed by the Olivier Award-winning Howard Davies. Since then he has maintained a theatre career alongside his screen work, playing roles varying from the Prince of Wales in The Madness of George III at the Leeds Playhouse (2003) to Nick Bottom in A Midsummer Night's Dream at the Bristol Old Vic (2003) and Angus in Birmingham Repertory Theatre's Neville's Island (2005).

In 2010 he was in Tom Morris' production of Swallows and Amazons, playing the seven-year-old Roger to "hilarious comic effect." Originally at the Bristol Old Vic, it then transferred to the West End. Wright's roles since have included Dogberry in Much Ado About Nothing, at the Rose Theatre Kingston (2018) and the pantomime dame at the Lyric Hammersmith (2014). His performance as Frank in The Memory of Water at the Nottingham Playhouse was lauded by Michael Billington of The Guardian, who called it "beautifully played".

Other projects

Wright has co-written and performed in two six part radio series. His first commission for BBC Radio 4 was Strangers on Trains (2008) in which he played 28 characters. This was later repeated on BBC Radio 4 Extra. He went on to write Earls of the Court with Perrier Award winner Will Adamsdale, which aired on Radio 4 in 2010. A hit with listeners, the pair played two Australians lost in London. The final episode was 'Pick of the Week' in the Radio Times. These characters were developed into a short film, Knights Of The Realm, which won Best comedy/dramedy short at the LA Film Festival and Best Dramedy at the LA Shorts Fest.

In response to the Coronavirus pandemic, Wright wrote and co-created three shows in association with Tobacco Factory Theatres. BS3 Santa (2020) was described as "street theatre meets travelling Santa's grotto" and toured a mini Christmas show to people's doorsteps in Bristol. Proving to be incredibly popular, BS3 Santa returned in 2021 in a different form, touring the show to entire Bristol streets rather than individual homes. In August 2021, Date Night in association with Tobacco Factory Theatres, toured to people's doorsteps in Bristol, described as "a travelling, pop-up comedy performance for your doorstep, driveway or garden".

In October 2021, Wright started a podcast with two friends whom he worked alongside in the theatre industry, Adam Peck and Tom Wainwright, Of Spice and Men. The podcast celebrates the joy of friendship, with the three men using the ritual of chatting over an Indian meal to navigate the perils of midlife, offering each other camaraderie, counsel, fun and a sprinkling of conflict to spice things up along the way.

== Filmography ==
Film
Year	Title	Role	Notes
1997	Fierce Creatures	Octopus Security Guard	
2001	Bridget Jones's Diary	Stage Manager	The film was nominated for the BAFTA Award for Best British Film, the Golden Globe Award for Best Motion Picture – Musical or Comedy, and the Satellite Award for Best Film – Musical or Comedy.
2001	High Heels and Low Lifes	Officer	
2001	Dog Eat Dog	Eastwood	
2002	Ali G Indahouse	Cameraman	
2004	If Only	Mike	
2005	The Best Man	Harry	
2006	A Good Year	Broker #1	
2007	World of Wrestling	Mr. Kendo	Short film
2008	Incendiary	Charlie	
2014	Nativity 3: Dude, Where's My Donkey?	Uncle Henry	
2016	Hit and Run	George	Short film
2017	Knights of the Realm	Lloydy	Won Best comedy/dramedy short at the Los Angeles Independent Film Festival and Best Dramedy at the LA Shorts Awards
2019	Jungle Cry	Paul Walsh	

Television
Year	Title	Role	Other notes
1997	Alexei Sayle's Merry-Go-Round	Various	Series 1, Episode 4
1997	Chalk	Policeman # 1	Episode: "The Star Pupil"
1999	People Like Us	Nick Levick	Episode: “The Estate Agent” Rose D'Or Light Entertainment Festival, Winner, Silver Rose Comedy 2000. Royal Television Society, Winner, Best Situation Comedy/Comedy Drama 2000. Nominated Best Comedy BAFTA awards 2000
2000	The Vicar of Dibley	Local TV newsreader	Episode: "Summer" Winner; National Television Awards 1998, Royal Television Society 1998, TV Quick Awards 2005, Rose d’Or Light Entertainment Festival 2007
2000	My Hero	Cricketer	Episode: "Thermoman's Greatest Challenge"
2000	Doctors	Dave Darwin	Episode: "Mum's The Word"
2000	Smack the Pony	Groom	Series 2, Episode 4 In 1999 and 2000, the first two series of Smack the Pony won the Emmy Award for the 'Best Popular Arts Show', and all three series were nominated for Bafta awards.
2000	Black Books	Second Customer	Episode: “Manny’s First Day” Black Books won the BAFTA for Best Situation Comedy in 2001 and 2005, and won a Bronze Rose at the Festival Rose d'Or of Montreux in 2001. It also received nominations for British Comedy Awards and the Irish Film and Television Awards
2000	I Saw You	Mistaken date	Granada series
2001	So What Now?	Terry	
2001	Murder in Mind	Steve	Episode: "Neighbors"
2001	World of Pub	Various Characters	Episodes: "Caine", "Sixties", "Drink", "Queen"
2001	Armadillo	Marius Van Meer	3 part drama
2001	Coupling	Harry	Episode “Dressed” Winner Best TV Comedy, British Comedy Awards 2003, Winner, Silver Rose, Rose D'Or Light Entertainment Festival 2001
2002	Rescue Me	Eddie Chisholm	Lead role
2002	Celeb	Matthew	Episode: "The Assassin"
2003	Ready When You Are, Mr McGill	Geoff 1st AD	Television film
2004	Wild West	PC Alan	Lead role Nominated for a Primetime Emmy
2004	Dirty Filthy Love	Rhodri	Television film Won Best Single Drama at the RTS Awards 2005
2004	Doc Martin	PC Mark Mylow	Series 1 and 2 Winner, Best TV Comedy Drama, British Comedy Awards 2004
2006	Spooks	Thames Barrier Guide	Series 5, Episode 10
2007	Bonkers	John Lewis	Lead role
2008	Love Soup	Jeff	Episode: "The Menaced Assassin"
2008	Filth: The Mary Whitehouse Story	Malcolm	Television film
2013	Love and Marriage	Kevin Paradise	Lead role; ITV series
2014	The Nightmare Worlds of H. G. Wells	Clarence Clint	Television film - Sky Arts
2016	Marley's Ghosts	Sergeant Hatfield	Series 2, Episode 1
2016	I Want My Wife Back	Curtis (Murray's Boss)	Lead role; BBC series
2017	Doctor Who	Alan	Episode "The Lie of the Land" (S10 E08)
2019	Casualty	Len Hartman	Series 33, Episode 21
2019	Doc Martin	Sergeant Mark Mylow	Series 9, Episode 4
2020	Doctors	Keith Gilmartin	Episode 78
2020	Small Axe	Mr Baines	Episode: Education
2023	Midsomer Murders	Shawn Dawlish	Series 23, Episode 4

=== Stage ===
Year	Title	Role	Venue
1998	The Magistrate	Constable Harris	Savoy Theatre / Chichester Festival Theatre
1998	Jackie	Bobby Kennedy	Queen's Theatre
1998	An Audience with the Queen	Jimmy	Riverside Studios
1999	Love and The Art of War	Professor Baldwin	King's Head Theatre
2001	All My Sons	Frank Lubey	Royal National Theatre
2003	The Madness of George III	The Prince of Wales	Leeds Playhouse
2003	A Midsummer Night's Dream	Nick Bottom	Bristol Old Vic
2005	Neville's Island	Angus	Birmingham Repertory Theatre
2007	Earls of the Court	Lloydy	Edinburgh Fringe
2008	The Nothing Show	One man show	Jacksons Lane
2009	Muscle	Dan	Bristol Old Vic / Hull Truck Theatre
2010	Misconception	Noel	Assembly Rooms
2011	Swallows and Amazons	Roger Walker	Bristol Old Vic / Vaudeville Theatre
2012	Wild Oats	John Dory	Bristol Old Vic
2012	Does My Society Look Big In This?	Various	Bristol Old Vic
2014	World Cup Final 1966	Jimmy Greaves	Bristol Old Vic
2014	Dick Whittington And His Cat	Dame	Lyric Hammersmith
2017	The Railway Children	Perks	Exeter Northcott
2018	Much Ado About Nothing	Dogberry	Rose Theatre Kingston
2019	The Memory of Water	Frank	Nottingham Playhouse

=== Radio ===
Year	Title	Role	Other notes
2000	Love and the Art of War	Professor Baldwin	BBC Radio 4 production
2009	Strangers on Trains	28 characters	BBC Radio 4 production
2010	Earls of the Court	Lloydy	BBC Radio 4 production
2013	Strangers on Trains	28 characters	BBC Radio 4 Extra - repeat
2018	Tracks	Tim	BBC Radio Drama
2018	Nights At The Circus	Colonel Kearney	BBC Radio Drama
