= Three Seven Eleven =

- Genre: Children's drama
- Directed by: John Darnell
- Starring: Julia Haworth; Nicola Redmond
- Country of origin: United Kingdom
- Original language: English
- No. of series: 2
- No. of episodes: 20

Production
- Executive producer: Edward Pugh
- Producer: Sue Pritchard
- Production locations: Barton, Greater Manchester, England, UK
- Production company: Granada Television

Original release
- Network: ITV (CITV)
- Release: 17 February 1993 – 15 June 1994

Three Seven Eleven is a children's drama series broadcast on CITV from 17 February 1993 and to 15 June 1994, set in the fictional Barton Wood Primary School in England. It follows the day-to- day adventures of several students. It was written by Bernard Ashley, Chris Ashley (author) and Marvin Close. It was filmed at Callands County Primary School in Callands, Warrington

The series was produced by Granada Television.
