= Christopher Halliwell =

English double murderer

Christopher Halliwell is an English murderer from Wiltshire convicted for the murders of both Becky Godden-Edwards and Sian O'Callaghan separately in the early 21st century. An author and retired police detective suggested in a book he may have carried out 27 additional murders.

== 1990s ==
=== Disappearance of Trevaline Evans ===
Trevaline Evans
- Disappeared: 16 June 1990 (aged 52); Llangollen, Wales
- Status: Missing for 36 years, 5 months and 4 days
- Spouse: Richard Evans

In 1990 Trevaline Evans disappeared from her shop in Llangollen in Wales. The case remains unsolved but In the Footsteps of Killers Channel 4 programme tentatively explored an eyewitness sighting and if Halliwell, who may have worked in the area, may have been worth considering as a suspect.

=== Murder of Maria Christine Requena ===
Murder of Maria Christina Requena
- Location: Leigh/Pennington Flash, Manchester, England
- Date: c. January 6, 1991; 35 years ago
- Assailant: unknown

Greater Manchester Police dismissed the Halliwell link suggested by the author Steven Fulcher.

=== Murder of Julie Finley ===
Murder of Julie Finley
- Location: Merseyside, England
- Date: c. August 5, 1994; 32 years ago
- Assailant: unknown

In 1994 Julie Finley disappeared from Liverpool on 5 August and was found murdered in Rainford the following day. Reports to Merseyside Police suggested Halliwell may have been involved and police looked into it in 2020. The case remains unsolved.

=== Disappearance of Sallyann John ===
Sallyann John
- Sally Ann John in 1995
- Disappeared: 8 September 1995 (aged 23); Swindon, Wiltshire, England
- Status: Missing for 31 years, 2 months and 12 days

In lead detective Stephen Fulcher's 2017 book on the O'Callaghan and Godden-Edwards cases, he wrote that after apprehending Halliwell he had ordered the re-opening of the investigation into the unsolved 1995 disappearance of sex worker Sally Ann John, believing he may have murdered her. She was last seen alive on Aylesbury Street in Swindon at 22:45 on Friday 8 September 1995, at an area near the town's red-light district. She was planning to look for clients that night until about midnight. Links were made to Halliwell as both he and the 23-year-old sex worker had lived on Broad Street, Swindon, and Halliwell was known to have been a client of hers. However, soon after Fulcher left the force, Wiltshire Police closed the investigation again.

The case was subsequently reopened in November 2014, this time as a murder inquiry, after the discovery of "significant new information" – although it was stated at this stage that the inquiry was not being linked to a new investigation at Halliwell's former home. In 2015, police searched Sally Ann John's last-known address in Kimmeridge Close in Swindon, and days later arrested three men, aged 52, 50 and 52, on suspicion of her kidnap and murder. They were subsequently released on bail pending further enquiries. In February 2017, two new searches were made at properties on Broad Street where Halliwell and John both lived.

In March 2017, the John case featured on the BBC TV programme Crimewatch. Detectives stated that they had liaised with the investigators on the Halliwell case but they were keeping an "open mind" on press reports claiming he may have been involved. John's mother revealed that her daughter had started to get involved with the "wrong people" in her late teens, and continued to associate with them despite warnings that they were bad characters, although shortly before she disappeared she had planned to try and get away from the life of sex work. After she vanished, her house had been searched but nothing was missing or abnormal. Most importantly, on the programme it was revealed that several postcards sent weeks after John's disappearance to a friend had been found to have been forged. One was sent from London three weeks after she vanished, claiming she was safe and well. The handwriting was conclusively found to have not been John's handwriting, showing that an unidentified person had purposely forged a message from her. Halliwell had lived in the same street, Broad Street, and been linked to the case in the 2014 reinvestigation. The case remains unsolved.

=== Murder of Caroline Glachan ===
Murder of Caroline Glachan
- Location: Bonhill, near Glasgow, Scotland
- Date: c. August 25, 1996; 30 years ago
- Assailant: Robert O'Brien
- No. of participants: 3
- Accused: 3
- Verdict: guilty

Caroline Glachan's murder was initially suspected to be the work of Halliwell but her boyfriend (completely unrelated to Halliwell) was later convicted in 2024 along with two others.

== 2000s ==
=== Disappearance of Linda Razzell ===
Linda Razzell
- Disappeared: 19 March 2002 (aged 41–42); Highworth near Swindon, Wiltshire, England
- Status: Missing for 24 years, 8 months and 1 day
- Spouse: Glyn Razzell

In 2002 Linda Razzell, in the process of a divorce, disappeared from Highworth near Swindon and her estranged husband was convicted for her murder without Linda's body being found. Former police investigator Steven Fulcher suggested a link to Halliwell but Halliwell had no known prior relationship with the Razzells and so this was considered speculative by police.

=== Murder of Becky Godden-Edwards ===
Murder of Becky Godden-Edwards
- Location: Swindon, Wiltshire, England
- Date: c. January 1, 2003; 23 years ago
- Assailant: Christopher Halliwell

In 2003 Becky Godden-Edwards disappeared from Swindon. During his arrest for the murder of Sian O'Callaghan in 2011, Halliwell confessed to the murder of Godden-Edwards, leading police to her body, for which he was later convicted. Police failure to caution him meant Halliwell did not face trial for this until 2016 but he had been imprisoned from 2011.

=== Disappearance of Claudia Lawrence ===
Claudia Lawrence
- Disappeared: c. 18 March 2009 (aged 35); York, England
- Status: Missing for 17 years, 8 months and 1 day

In 2009 Claudia Lawrence disappeared from York. Former police investigator Steven Fulcher suggested a link to Halliwell but North Yorkshire Police considered this unlikely as CCTV showed Halliwell in Swindon the night before. The case remains unsolved.

== 2010s ==
=== Murder of Sian O'Callaghan ===
Murder of Sian O'Callaghan
- Location: Swindon, Wiltshire, England
- Date: March 19, 2011; 15 years ago
- Assailant: Christopher Halliwell

In 2011 Sian O'Callaghan disappeared from Swindon and shortly after her body was discovered, Halliwell was convicted for her murder.
