= Caroline Catz =

British actress and narrator (born 1969)

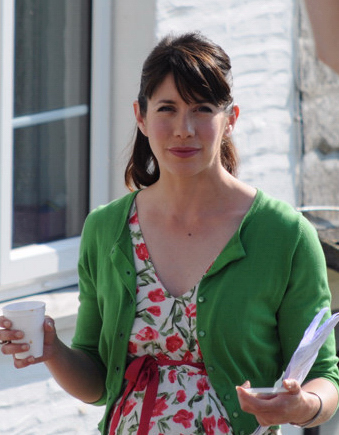
- Catz on the set of Doc Martin in 2009
- Born: Caroline Caplan; 19 October 1969 (age 57); Manchester, Lancashire, England
- Occupations: Actress and narrator
- Years active: 1991–present
- Television: The Vice (1999–2003); Doc Martin (2004–2022); DCI Banks (2012–2016); I Want My Wife Back (2016); A Small Light (2023)
- Spouse: Michael Higgs (m. 2007)
- Children: 2

Caroline Catz (born Caroline Caplan; 19 October 1969) is a British film, television, and theatre actress and narrator. She is best known for her role as Louisa Glasson in Doc Martin (2004–2022). Her other major roles have included Auguste van Pels in A Small Light, Detective Inspector Kate Ashurst in Murder in Suburbia, Detective Inspector Helen Morton in DCI Banks, and PC Cheryl Hutchins in The Vice.

== Early life ==
Catz was born on 19 October 1969 in Manchester to Jewish parents Bernard and Rosemary Caplan.

== Career ==
She played opposite Michael Kitchen in the TV movie The Guilty in June 1992. In 1994, she took a lead role in the BBC's All Quiet on the Preston Front, which ran for three series. She followed this with a spell in The Bill as Rosie Fox, during which she met Michael Higgs, who later became her husband. Her part in The Bill was the first of four long-term roles in which she played police officers: in The Vice she was a PC; in Murder in Suburbia and DCI Banks she was a Detective Inspector.

From 2004 to 2022, Catz starred in ITV's Doc Martin, in which she played primary school headmistress Louisa Ellingham (née Glasson).

Catz continued to appear in one-off roles, including In Denial of Murder, in which she played real-life murder victim Wendy Sewell, and in an episode of Hotel Babylon. She also appeared in a two-part episode of Single Handed, entitled The Stolen Child, as Dr Maggie Hunter. Originally shown in Ireland in January 2008, the episode was broadcast by ITV on 9 August 2009.

From 2012 until 2016, she played Detective Inspector Helen Morton in DCI Banks. In November 2016, ITV cancelled the programme.

In 2014, Catz directed the documentary titled A Message to the World...Whatever Happened to Jesse Hector? Also in 2014, she narrated the BBC's television documentary Ebola – The Search for a Cure.

Catz starred in the 2016 BBC One sitcom series I Want My Wife Back, playing the role of Bex.

In 2017, Catz wrote, directed, and starred in a short documentary on Delia Derbyshire, Delia Derbyshire: The Myths And The Legendary Tapes, (2017), which was screened at the BFI London Film Festival. She expanded it into a feature-length film that debuted in October 2020.

In 2018, she was the narrator on Britain's Biggest Warship, a documentary series about the aircraft carrier HMS Queen Elizabeth (R08).

=== Radio ===
She co-starred in Déjà Vu, a radio play broadcast by BBC Radio 4 on 4 February 2009.

=== Stage ===
In November 2008, she played Anna, the puppet maker, in the stage production On Emotion. She has previously appeared in the West End in the Out of Joint/Royal Court Theatre production of Mark Ravenhill's Shopping and Fucking in 1997, which earned controversy for its subject matter, while Catz herself appeared topless in one scene. However, she gained notice for her performance by critics, as well as for being the only woman in the production.

In 2012, she played Marlene in Caryl Churchill's play Top Girls directed by Max Stafford-Clark. In 2018, Catz played Susan in Curtains at the Rose Theatre in Kingston. Other theatre roles include Haunted (West End), The Recruiting Officer (Chichester Festival Theatre), Dogs Barking (Bush Theatre) and Six Degrees of Separation at the Royal Court Theatre.

=== Music ===
During the early 1990s she was the vocalist of the indie rock band Monolond which went on to become the folk orientated group Sapphire, an EP was released and an album recorded which was not released.

== Personal life ==
Since 2007, Catz has been married to actor Michael Higgs, whom she met on the set of The Bill in the late 1990s. They have a son born in 2001 and a daughter born in 2006.

== Filmography ==
=== Film ===
Year	Title	Role	Notes
1994	The Curious	(unknown)	Short films
1996	Litter	Ann	Short films
1996	China	China	Short films
2004	Girl Afraid	(unknown)	Short films
2009	A Postcard from Brighton	Amanda Penrose	Short films
2009	Radio Mania: An Abandoned Work	Mary	Short films
2012	I, Anna	Louise	
2014	A Message to the World...Whatever Happened to Jesse Hector?	–	Short film. Director & co-producer
2016	ChickLit	Jen	
2017	Cupidity	Carol	Short film
2018	In Fabric	Pam	
2020	Delia Derbyshire: The Myths and Legendary Tapes	Delia Derbyshire	Also writer & director. Was also a 2018 short film
2023	Scala!!!	Herself - Actor / Filmmaker	
2024	The Extraordinary Miss Flower	Miss Flower	

=== Television ===
==== Acting ====
Year	Title	Role	Notes
1991	The Upper Hand	Receptionist	Episode: "Older Than Springtime"
1992	The English Programme	Linda	2 episodes: "Have Fun: Parts 1 & 2"
1992	The Guilty	Nicky Lennon	Mini-series; 2 episodes
1992	Under the Sun	Linda	Television film
1994	Peak Practice	Carol Dart	Episode: "Act of Remembrance"
1994–1997	All Quiet on the Preston Front	Dawn Lomax	19 episodes
1995	Moving Story	Caroline	Episode: "Canterbury Tales"
1996	Screen Two	Ruth Wallace / Sian	Episode: "Look Me in the Eye"
1996	The Merchant of Venice	Jessica	Television film
1998–2000	The Bill	Rosie Fox	8 episodes
1999–2003	The Vice	PC Cheryl Hutchins	28 episodes
2003	Real Men	Liz Fenton	Television films
2004	In Denial of Murder	Wendy Sewell	Television films
2004–2005	Murder in Suburbia	DI Kate 'Ash' Ashurst	12 episodes
2004–2022	Doc Martin	Louisa Glasson/Ellingham	79 episodes
2008–2009	Single-Handed	Dr. Maggie Hunter	2 episodes: "The Stolen Child: Parts 1 & 2"
2009	Hotel Babylon	Erin Martyn	2 episodes
2010	Agatha Christie's Marple	Hazel	Episode: "The Blue Geranium"
2010	Conversations with My Wife	Trish	Unknown episodes
2012–2016	DCI Banks	DI Helen Morton	24 episodes
2015	Valentine's Kiss	Helen	Mini-series; 2 episodes
2016	I Want My Wife Back	Bex	6 episodes
2020	McDonald & Dodds	Alison Speirs	Episode: "A Wilderness of MIrrors"
2021	The Canterville Ghost	Lucy Otis	4 episodes: "Spring", "Summer", Autumn" & "Winter"
2023	A Small Light	Auguste Van Pels	Mini-series; 7 episodes

==== Narration ====
In addition to her acting work, Catz has provided voice-overs for numerous TV documentaries, including:

- Windscale: Britain's Biggest Nuclear Disaster (2007)
- Cutting Edge (1 episode; 2009)
- Horizon (1 episode; 2014)
- Countdown to Murder (13 episodes; 2013–2015)
- The Conspiracy Files (7 episodes; 2006–2016)
- The Big Think: Should We Go to Mars? (2017)
- Exposure (4 episodes; 2017–2021)
- Britain's Biggest Warship (3 episodes; 2018)
- Panorama (1 episode; 2018)
- Inside Europe: 10 Years of Turmoil (1 episode; 2019)
- Cuba: Castro vs the World (1 episode; 2019)
- My Grandparents' War (3 episodes; 2019–2022)
- Dispatches (1 episode; 2020)
- The Queen and the Coup (2020)
- Suzy Lamplugh: The Unsolved Mystery (2020)
- Outbreak: The Virus That Shook the World (2021)
- Trump Takes on the World (3 episodes; 2021)
- Savile: Portrait of a Predator (2021)
- Farewell Doc Martin (2022)
- The Billionaires Who Made Our World (4 episodes; 2023)
- Putin vs the West (3 episodes; 2023–2024)
- Inside China: The Battle for Tibet (2025)
- Undercover: A year in Reform (2026)

=== Video games ===
Year	Title	Role	Notes
2018	Thronebreaker: The Witcher Tales	Rayla (voice)	
