= Wrongful conviction of Peter Sullivan =

British man wrongfully convicted of murder

Peter Sullivan (born 1956/57) is a British man who was wrongfully convicted of the murder of Diane Sindall in 1987. He served 38 years in prison before being exonerated by DNA evidence on 13 May 2025, at the age of 68. He is the longest-serving known victim of a miscarriage of justice in British history. As of 2026, the identity of the murderer is unknown, with him believed to be a serial rapist and murderer who operated around the area, known as The Beast.

== Murder and investigation ==
Locations
1 Memorial Stone for Diane Sindall, Birkenhead CH41 2RA

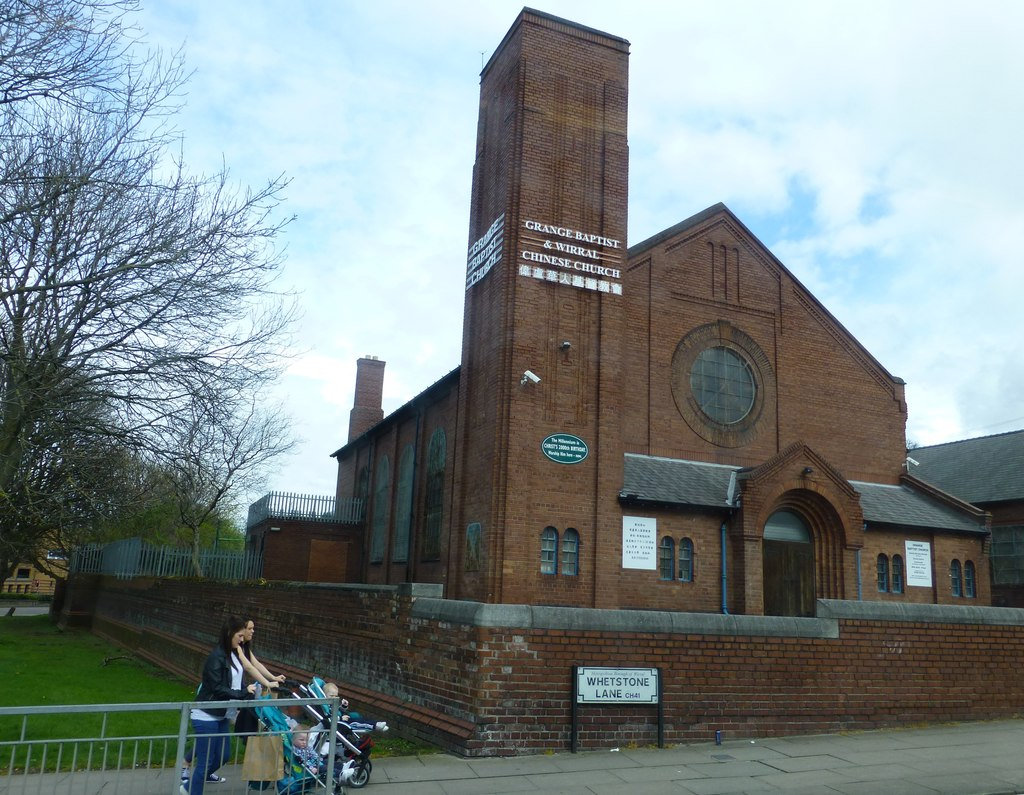
Sindall was murdered near the rear of this church.

On the morning of 2 August 1986, the body of 21-year-old Diane Sindall, of Seacombe, Merseyside, was found half-naked in an alleyway near Fearnley Road off Borough Road in Birkenhead. Her head and face had been beaten with a blunt object, theorised to have been either a crowbar or a car jack, she had been stabbed repeatedly in the chest and genitals, and had been raped. Large sections of her body had been mutilated when the attacker bit her. The night before, Sindall had left The Wellington Hotel in Bebington where she was working as a barmaid to save money for her forthcoming wedding. She had intended to drive home, but ended up walking along Borough Road after running out of fuel in Birkenhead. Sindall was seen walking along Borough Road near the Mersey Tunnel by passing drivers, with the last known individual seen with her a man of a similar age, walking backwards and speaking with her, with Sindall seeming uncomfortable. Despite this, The Beast appeared charismatic, albeit frustrated that his advances to Sindall appeared to be dismissed. He was wearing a leather jacket, jeans, and had a haircut similar to a crew cut. This is believed to be the only sighting of the serial rapist and murderer known as "The Beast of Birkenhead".

Witnesses reported hearing screaming, and seeing and hearing a couple arguing, between midnight and 2 a.m on 2 August. Sindall had sustained a fractured skull and injuries to her face consistent with being beaten repeatedly with a blunt object, and had been sexually assaulted, with mutilation of the breasts and lacerated genitals. It was thought that Sindall had remained alive for some time after the attack. The cause of death was brain haemorrhage, probably caused by multiple blows to her head. Her body was examined by a pathologist who said that her injuries were "the very worst" he had ever seen on a body "outside of a road traffic accident". The man responsible for the crime has been dubbed the "Mersey Ripper", "the Beast of Birkenhead", and "The Wolfman". Two weeks later her partially burned clothing was recovered by police at Bidston Hill.

The murder caused revulsion, fear and anger in Merseyside, with many women afraid to be out alone on the streets. The murder investigation which followed was the largest in the history of Merseyside Police.

== Arrest and conviction ==
Sullivan, an unemployed labourer from Birkenhead, was arrested on suspicion of Sindall's murder on 23 September. He was arrested on circumstantial evidence; he reportedly gave conflicting statements to his whereabouts on 1 and 2 August. According to Sullivan, while in custody he was beaten, denied food, sleep and legal representation, and threatened with rape charges if he did not confess. On 24 September, he reportedly broke down in tears and confessed to the murder before withdrawing the confession. This alleged confession was not recorded, unlike many of Merseyside Police's other interviews with Sullivan. He later repeated the confession, but withdrew it following access to a solicitor on 25 September; he was not previously given access to legal advice, as it was deemed that it may have been a "hindrance to the enquiry". During the confession, an officer asked Sullivan to indicate on a map where Sindall's clothes were hidden. When Sullivan pointed to the wrong area, the officer allegedly told him which location he should point to. Sullivan was later described by a psychologist as "suggestible" and having "limited intellectual capacity". Despite being aware that Sullivan had learning disabilities, the police did not provide an appropriate adult as required by law.

At trial in 1987, the evidence against Sullivan was his confessions, as well as bite marks on Sindall's body being matched to him. Semen samples taken from Sindall's body were not analysed for DNA evidence because the technology was not available to Merseyside Police at the time. The prosecution suggested that he had attacked Sindall in a drunken rage after having lost a game of darts earlier in the day.

Sullivan pleaded not guilty, but was convicted and sentenced to life imprisonment with a minimum term of 16 years. He continued to maintain his innocence throughout his imprisonment.

== Exoneration ==
In 2008 the Criminal Cases Review Commission (CCRC) rejected an application for Sullivan's conviction to be reviewed, saying that there was little chance that new DNA evidence could be recoverable from the stored forensic samples. Sullivan's application to the Court of Appeal in 2019 was also rejected.

In 2021 the CCRC stated that advances in forensic investigation meant that retesting the crime scene samples had become worthwhile. Tests showed that Sullivan's DNA was not present in the semen samples taken from the crime scene, and the genetic markers present indicated an unknown DNA profile.

In May 2025, Sullivan's conviction was quashed in the Court of Appeal by Lord Justice Holroyde, Mr Justice Goss, and Mr Justice Bryan; he became eligible for immediate release from prison, at the age of 68. Merseyside Police are now investigating the DNA profile, which does not match anyone from Sindall's family nor her fiancé. They plan to request samples from other people who were investigated during the original investigation.

Sullivan is the longest-serving known victim of a miscarriage of justice in British history, having served 38 years in prison before being released at the age of 68. However, UK legislation requires that he must still prove that he is innocent "beyond reasonable doubt" if he wishes to claim compensation from the government.

Labour MP Kim Johnson, the chair of the all-party parliamentary group on miscarriages of justice, called for an independent inquiry into the case.

== 2026 re-examination ==
In January 2026, a £20,000 reward was offered for information leading to a conviction of Sindall's killer.

== Media ==
The case has been featured on Crimewatch.

An eight-episode podcast "The Beast of Birkenhead" by the BBC (part of their Crime Next Door series) was broadcast in April 2026.

== See also ==
- List of miscarriage of justice cases
