= Port Gaverne =

Hamlet in Cornwall, England

Coordinates: 50.5926°N 4.8227°W

Port Gaverne: Cornish: Porthkaveran
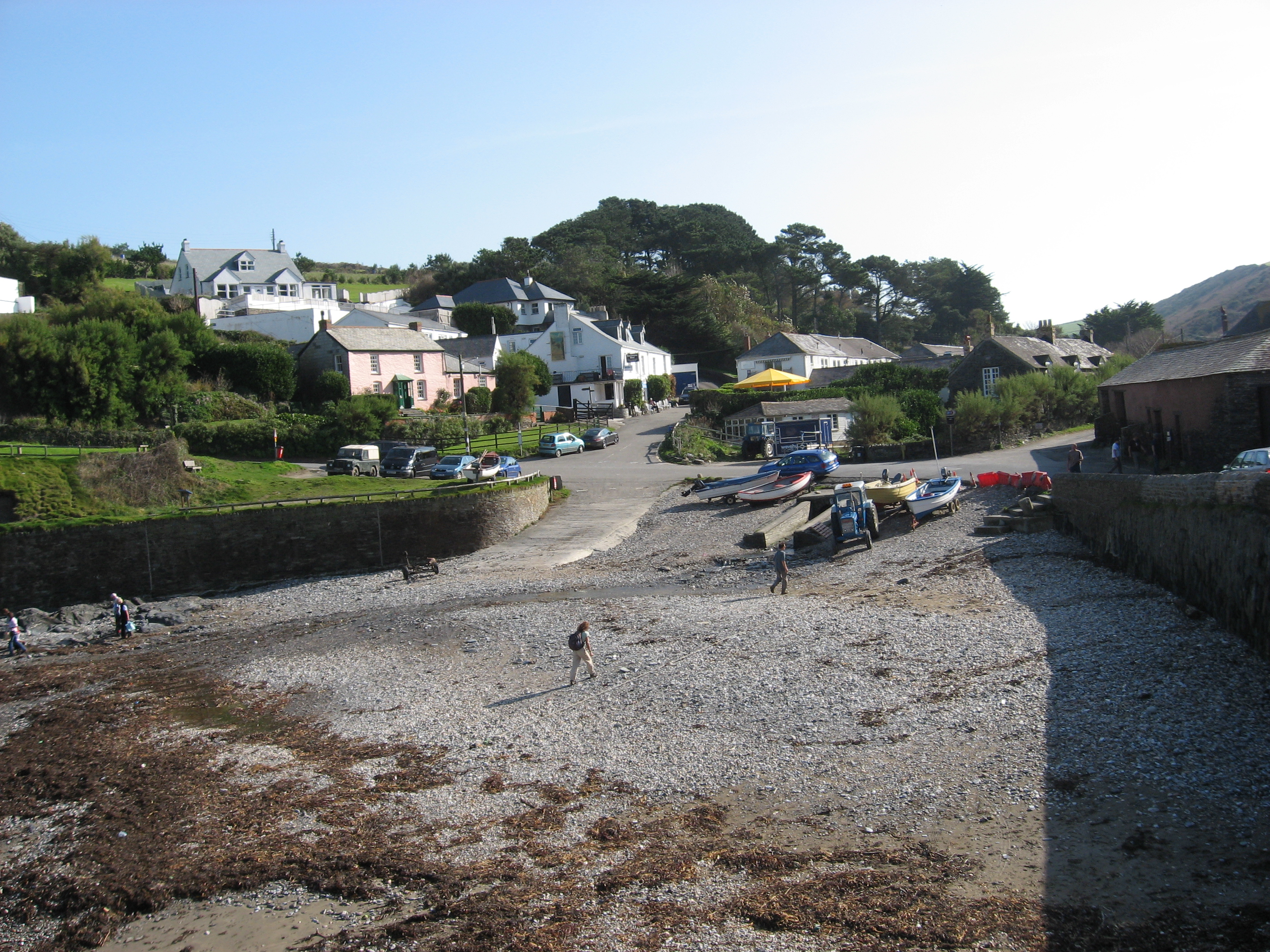

- Location within Cornwall
- Civil parish: St Endellion
- Unitary authority: Cornwall
- Ceremonial county: Cornwall
- Region: South West
- Country: England
- Sovereign state: United Kingdom

Port Gaverne (Cornish: Porthkaveran) is a hamlet on the north coast of Cornwall, England, UK, about 0.5 miles (0.80 km) east of Port Isaac and part of St Endellion parish.

Although it is a geographically discrete hamlet, some consider it as part of the larger village of Port Isaac located around the headland, upon which it relies for most services.

Historically, Port Gaverne existed as a port for sand and slate from the local mine, and for the local fishing catch, particularly pilchards, and has little recorded history prior to the 19th century, when economic activity at the port was at its peak. In the 20th century these industries declined as railways supplanted transport by sea.

The appearance of the hamlet has changed little in two centuries, with its stone and slate buildings recognised for their character and the rugged local coastline as a heritage coast. Nowadays the settlement relies almost entirely upon tourism. The parish has just over 1,000 residents, including a significant proportion of retired people, but the hamlet itself consists mostly of second homes and holiday lets. Along with Port Isaac it has become known as the filming location for ITV's Doc Martin television series.

== Etymology ==
The name ‘Gaverne’ is thought to have come from 'Karn Hun', which in the dialect of Cornish local to the area means ‘rocky haven‘. It is believed the pronunciation evolved before being written down; the first written reference to the settlement from 1338 records it as "Porcaveran". In the 16th century, the English cartographer John Norden called it “Port-kerne", and indeed linked this name to the cove, suggesting that the natural harbour is the 'port' regardless of any settlement. Writing in 1833–4, Dr Frederick Trevan referred to the settlement as "Porth Karn Hun...now commonly called Port Gavern". It is still spelled 'Gavern' by some locals - pronounced 'gay-verne'.

== History ==
Port Gaverne was a small port similar to many on the north coast of Cornwall, but there are few references to the settlement in history before the nineteenth century. In 1338 there is a reference to the fishing tithes levied by the Duchy of Cornwall, created the year before, in its accounts. Writing in 1584, Norden described "a litle cove for fisher-boates; and ther was somtymes a crane to lifte up and downe suche comodities as were ther taken in to be transported, or browght in and unloden: and ther have bene divers buyldinges, now all decayde since the growing of Portissick”. Fishing boats were launched from the beach, and it is thought that boats from Port Isaac moved here in the 1500s when a pier was constructed in that harbour.

In 1762 there is a reference to a lease of some land for loading sand; sand from the sea was rich in lime and used as fertiliser on Cornish soils. Historian John Maclean mentioned in 1872 that women and children earned a good income by harvesting sand. This activity continued into the 20th century. The sand was also used to produce quicklime and there are the remains of a lime kiln and records of a further kiln of which the remains are lost.

In 1802 Warwick Guy, of the family that owned much of the Port, leased land to build a fish cellar (a Cornish term for a building used to make and store fishing pots, nets, sails and equipment, and historically to process the catch), one of four eventually constructed by the Guy family, who continued to live and work in the area for the next hundred years. The fishing season was only two months long, but catches were large. In 1811 it was recorded that two of the fish cellars handled over 225 tons of fish during one week. There was also some shipbuilding at the Port.

The port's principal trade was the export of slate from Delabole Quarry to the northeast, those sailing ketches being too wide for the harbour at Port Isaac from where much of the trade relocated during the early 19th century. In 1807 the Delabole Slate Company quarried out a road from the mine down to the harbour. Coal was imported and other local produce, particularly pilchards, but also sand for fertiliser, was exported. In 1833–4, Dr Trevan describes a "small unsafe cove where [the] principal business of parish [is] carried on chiefly in slate – 3000 to 4000 tons annually", with the Port then having five families of thirty five inhabitants total. In 1859, Murray's Handbook of Devon and Cornwall recorded that "the quarries present one of the most astonishing and animated scenes imaginable". About 1,000 men were employed, raising about 120 tons of slate per day. This was cut and hauled 6 miles (9.7 km) to Port Gaverne where it would be loaded onto ships. Thirty wagons, pulled by over a hundred horses, would load a sixty-ton ship. Loading slates was often done by women, as the men were out fishing, and women still helped with stowing the slates through to the 1890s.

Some time between 1873 and 1880, the road to Port Isaac was dug up over the headland by convicts from Dartmoor Prison, to enable slate to be carried there by road rather than ferried around the headland.

When the North Cornwall Railway line to Wadebridge (later absorbed by the London & South Western Railway) opened in 1895, the transport of Delabole slate switched to rail and Port Gaverne lost most of its trade. The pilchard trade continued, until the fishing catches reduced, forcing the boats to move away.

The new railway made the area more accessible, and quickly the local economy adapted to cater for visitors. In 1897, sail lofts were converted to accommodation for school groups. By 1906 there were two cafes in the hamlet, and six bathing huts on the beach. The Union Inn, subsequently renamed the Port Gaverne Hotel, began to accommodate tourists, and ‘Headlands’ became a hotel.

During the Second World War, Port Gaverne hosted evacuees, and the fish cellars were converted into homes for the children, along with the clifftop Headlands Hotel. Some of these cellars provide holiday accommodation. A series of tank traps were installed in the cove in case of German invasion.

== Geography ==
The Draft Neighbourhood Plan describes the local coastline as "particularly rugged, unique and spectacular", "recognised as a heritage coast, whilst inland the area remains extensively unspoilt with prevailing rural characteristics". The hamlet lies within the Pentire Point to Widemouth Section of the Cornwall Area of Outstanding Natural Beauty. According to the AONB Management Plan, the local area has "a noticeable lack of tree cover due to the exposure to coastal winds". Land use is "mainly agricultural grazing in small to medium sized fields of medieval origin although modern farming practice has resulted in some larger fields being created". There is also coastal heathland with "rough and scrubby land leading inwards from the coast".

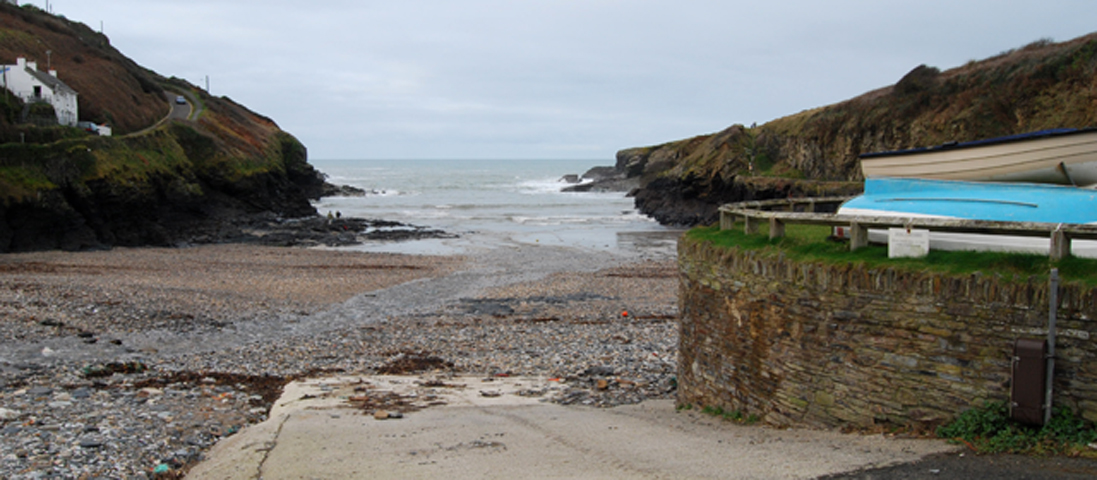
Port Gaverne

The buildings of the hamlet have mostly remained unchanged for two hundred years. The steep hillsides enclosing the hamlet have forced developers to look at the flat, if exposed, land on the headland between Ports Gaverne and Isaac for new build. The AONB Management Plan describes slate as "the characteristic local building and hedging material, varying from the mid hues of Delabole slate to the darker shades sourced at Trebarwith". The Draft Neighbourhood Plan identifies Port Gaverne as a "Character Area" that contains a number of listed buildings including the former fish cellars, with planning restrictions to ensure that any development "respects and maintains the character of the area".

== Governance ==
Port Gaverne is part of the Cornwall Council local authority area, covering the county of Cornwall. The council is a unitary authority; the local ward is St Minver & St Endellion, which was won at the last 2017 local election by the Conservative candidate Carole Mould, having previously been represented by an Independent, Andy Penny. This is part of the North Cornwall parliamentary constituency, represented since 2015 by Conservative MP Scott Mann.

The local parish council is St Endellion. The parish takes its name from Saint Endelienta, who is said to have evangelised the district in the fifth century and to have been one of the children of King Brychan. The parish produced a Neighbourhood Development Plan proposal in 2019.

== Demography ==
According to the 2011 census, the population of the parish was 1,029 in 480 households. Of these residents, 120 were aged under 16, and 320 aged 65 or over. 485 were recorded as economically active. In 2015 the magazine Cornwall Life reported that there were just twenty residents in Port Gaverne itself.

The population of the parish is declining, as younger groups (particularly families) move away in search of job opportunities and more affordable housing.

== Economy and services ==
The historic principal occupations within the parish of fishing and agriculture have been replaced by tourism, which has boomed, particularly since Port Isaac became the filming location for the ITV television series Doc Martin in 2004 and for the 2019 feature film Fisherman's Friends, both of which included shooting in Port Gaverne. A 2013 University of Plymouth study found that visitors had "clear destination images of Port Isaac prior to their visit", with the television series acting as "a display window for the village and surrounding area". The research indicated that it "acted as a key influence on intention to visit", particularly for more educated middle aged tourists. Port Gaverne is also known as a popular site for diving and for launching boats for fishing trips.

The hamlet relies upon nearby Port Isaac for almost all of its services, except for the hotel, restaurant and bar at the Port Gaverne Hotel. The county council profiles the settlement as being associated with Port Isaac.

The beach is maintained by the National Trust, having been bequeathed to it by a local family to protect the character of the cove.

Port Gaverne mostly consists of holiday accommodation. In 2007/8 the housing affordability ratio (defined as median house prices as a ratio of median incomes) of the parish was recorded at 48.6, compared to the English average of 15.4.

== Transport ==
The hamlet is accessible by narrow single track lanes, from Port Isaac and the B3267 from the west, and from the B3314 to the east. Parking is difficult in the hamlet itself, but there is a car park on top of the headland toward Port Isaac. The area is popular with walkers and for dog walking, with many local footpaths including the Cornish Coastal Path. The 96 bus service runs into Port Isaac, connecting to Wadebridge and Delabole.
