= Andrew Watkinson =

Andrew Watkinson may refer to:

- Andrew Watkinson (musician) in Endellion Quartet
- Andrew Lancel, né Andrew Watkinson, actor
