= Fern Cottage =

Listed house in Cornwall

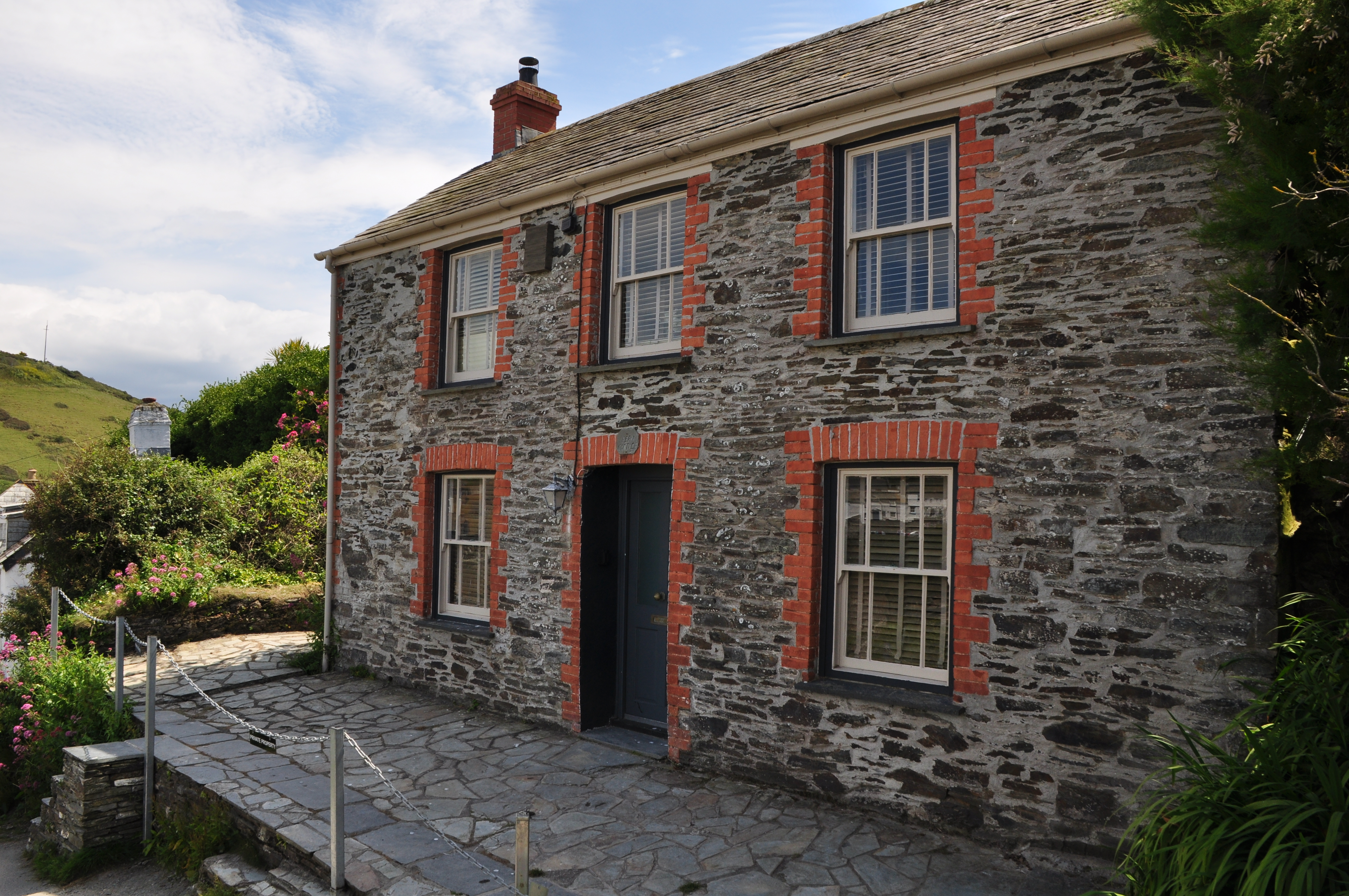
- Fern Cottage, pictured in 2011

- Location within Cornwall
- 50.59224°N 4.83356°W
- Location: 4 Roscarrock Hill, Port Isaac, Cornwall, England

Site notes
- Elevation: 23 m (75 ft)

Listed Building – Grade II
- Official name: 4, Roscarrock Hill
- Designated: 26 June 1987
- Reference no.: 1291076

Fern Cottage is a Grade II listed building in the English village of Port Isaac, Cornwall. Situated on the south side of the harbour, its address is 4 Roscarrock Hill. It is recognisable as the exterior view of the home and surgery of Doctor Martin Ellingham in the ITV television series Doc Martin; interior shots were filmed inside a nearby barn.

The cottage was placed on the list of historic buildings in 1987. Built in the mid- to late 19th century, its materials are stone rubble with brick dressing. It has a slate roof.

== Gallery ==
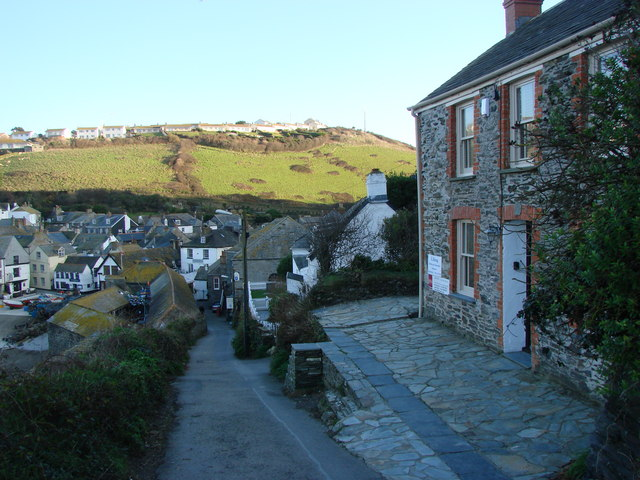
Fern Cottage, looking southeast down Roscarrock Hill

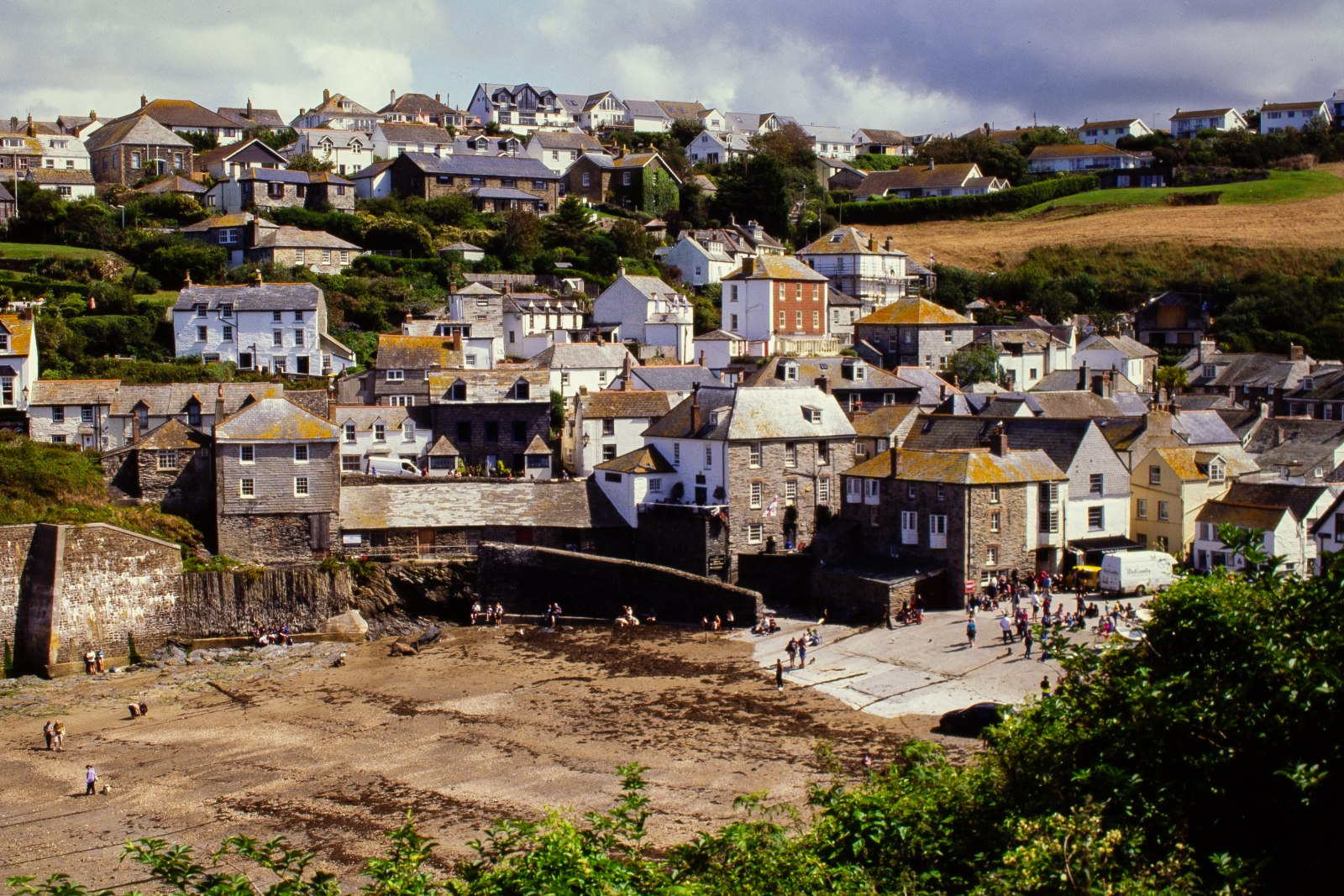
Looking east across Port Isaac harbour from in front of Fern Cottage

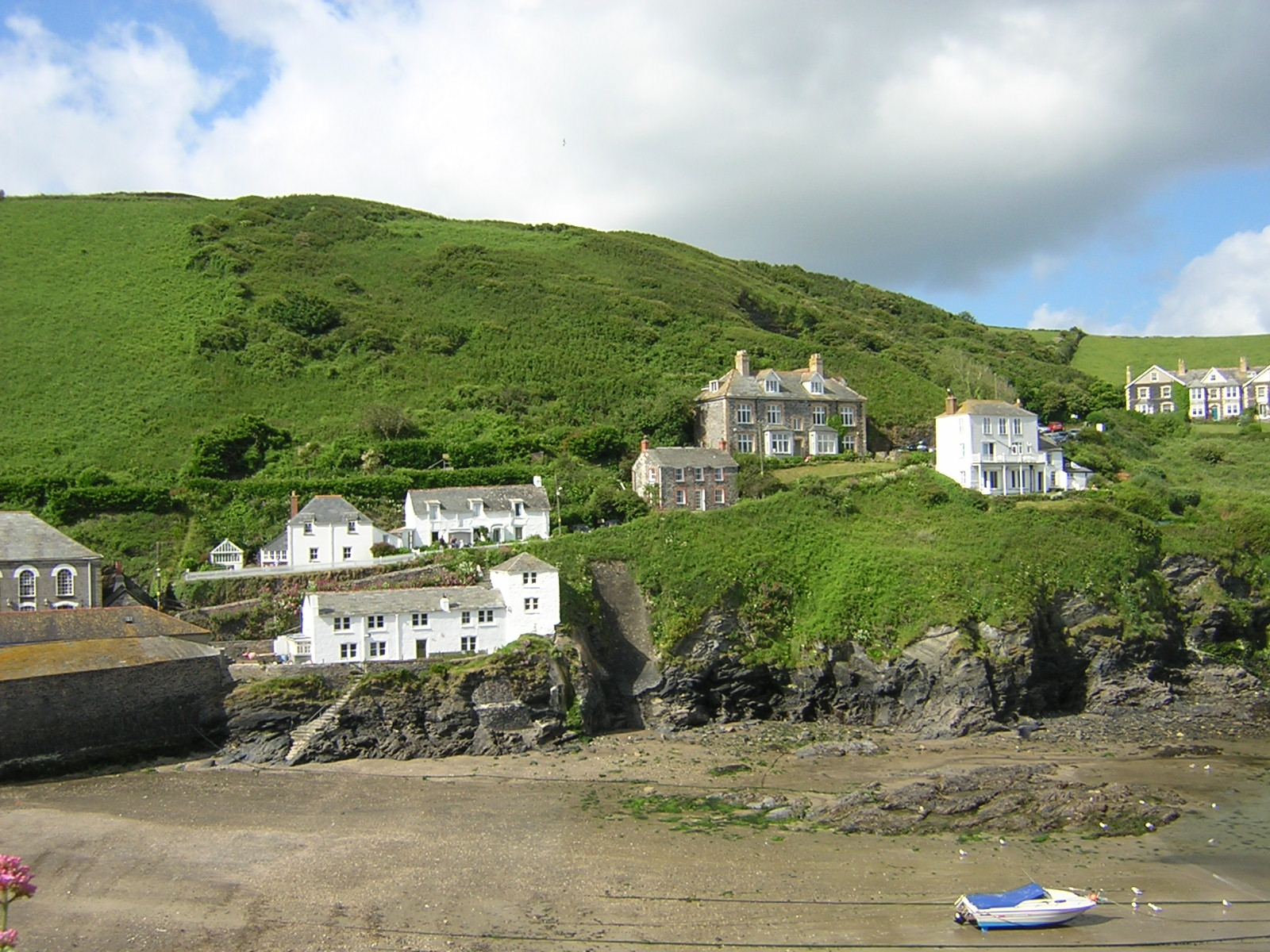
View from the western side of the harbour
