= Barstowite =

Mineral

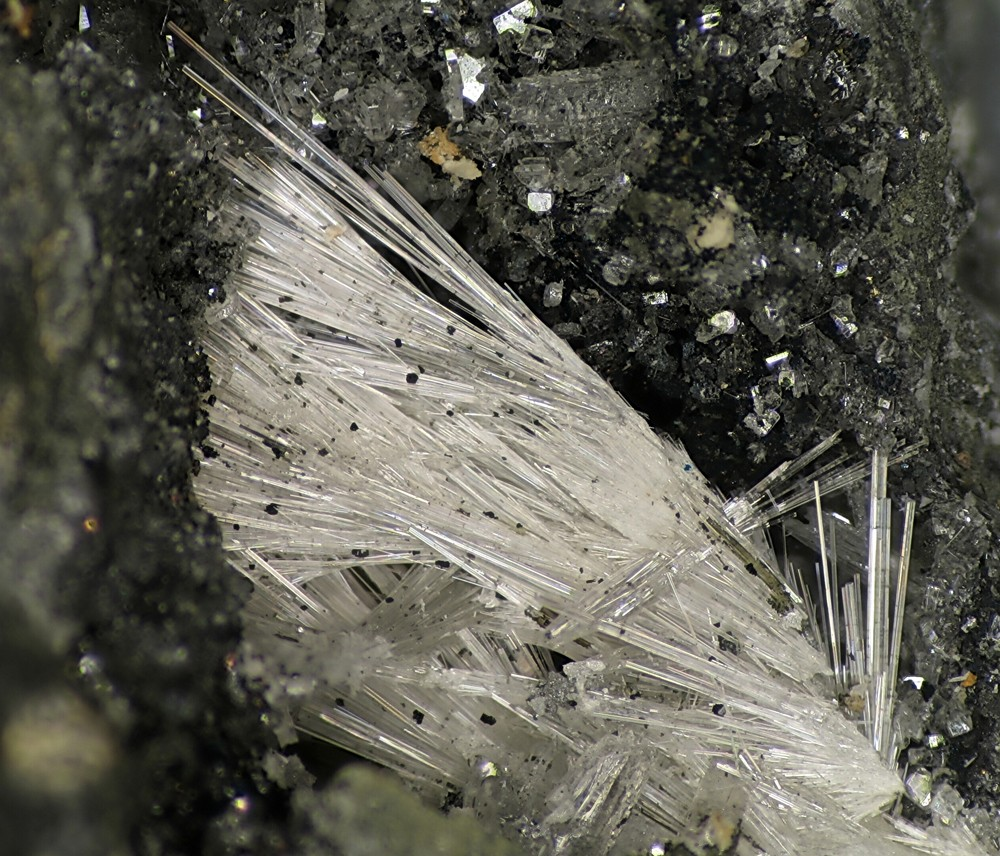
- Barstowite from Passa Limani area, Lavrion District, Attiki Prefecture, Greece

General
- Category: Halide minerals
- Formula: Pb_{4}[Cl_{6}|CO_{3}]•H_{2}O
- IMA symbol: Bsw
- Strunz classification: 3.DC.95
- Crystal system: Monoclinic
- Crystal class: Prismatic (2/m) (same H-M symbol)
- Space group: P2_{1}/m

Identification
- Color: White to transparent
- Mohs scale hardness: 3
- Luster: Adamantine
- Streak: White

Barstowite, formula Pb_{4}[Cl_{6}|CO_{3}]•H_{2}O, is a transparent to white mineral in the monoclinic system. It has a Mohs hardness of 3, a white streak and an adamantine lustre.

The type locality for Barstowite is Bounds Cliff, St Endellion, Cornwall in the United Kingdom. It is named after Richard W. Barstow (1947–1982), a Cornish mineral collector.
