= Port Isaac =

Village in Cornwall, England

Coordinates: 50.5935°N 4.8312°W

Port Isaac: Cornish: Porthysek
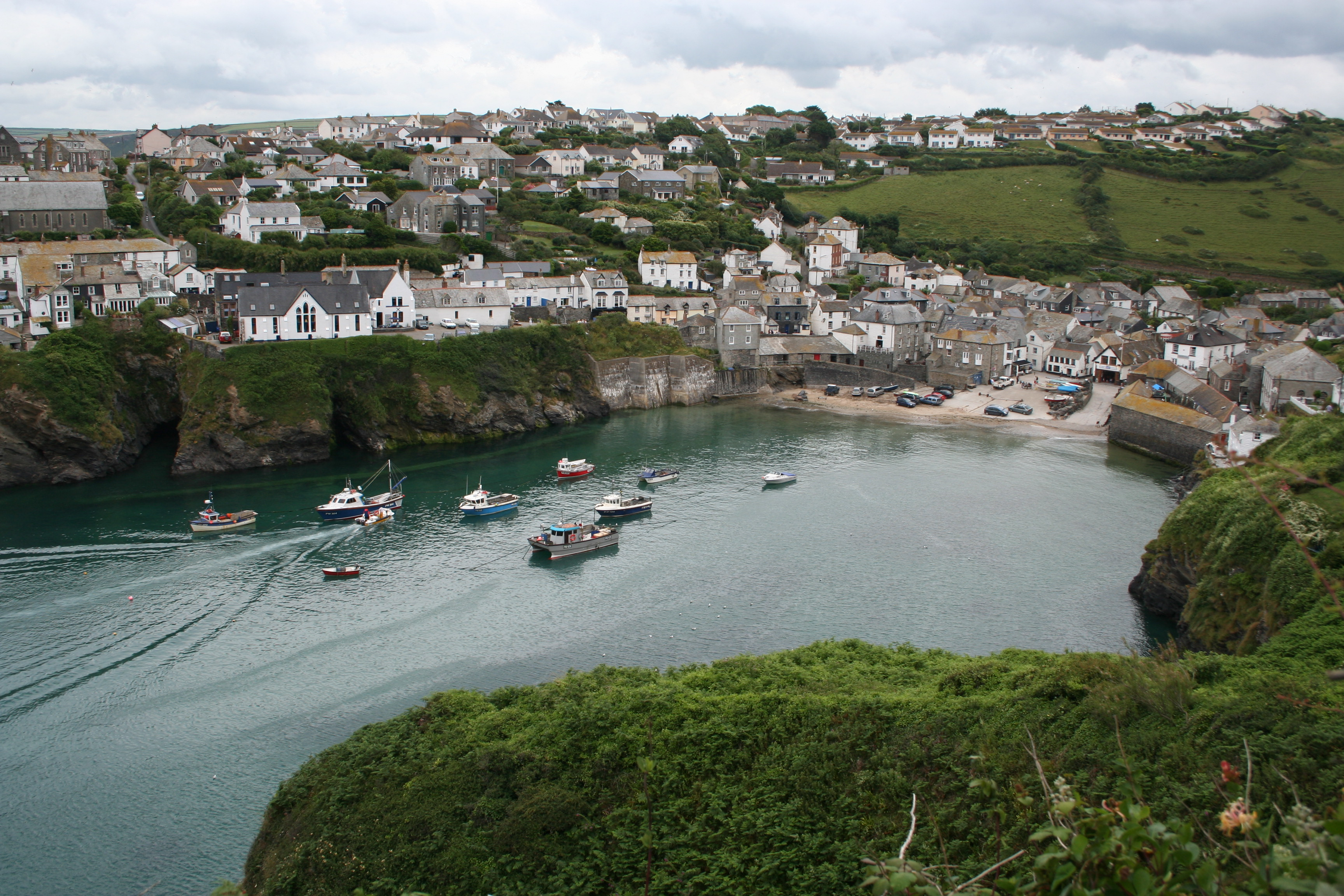
- Port Isaac viewed from the hill to the western side of the village

- Location within Cornwall
- Population: 721
- OS grid reference: SW997809
- Civil parish: St Endellion
- Unitary authority: Cornwall
- Ceremonial county: Cornwall
- Region: South West
- Country: England
- Sovereign state: United Kingdom
- Post town: PORT ISAAC
- Postcode district: PL29
- Dialling code: 01208
- Police: Devon and Cornwall
- Fire: Cornwall
- Ambulance: South Western
- UK Parliament: North Cornwall

Port Isaac (Cornish: Porthysek) is a small fishing village on the Atlantic coast of north Cornwall, England, in the United Kingdom. The nearest towns are Wadebridge and Camelford, each ten miles (16 km) away. A nearby hamlet, Port Gaverne, is sometimes considered to be part of Port Isaac. The meaning of the village's Cornish name, Porthysek, is "port abounding in corn", indicating a trade in corn from the arable inland district.

From 2004 to 2022, the village served as the backdrop to the ITV television series Doc Martin. It also is home to the sea-shanty singing group Fisherman's Friends.

== History ==
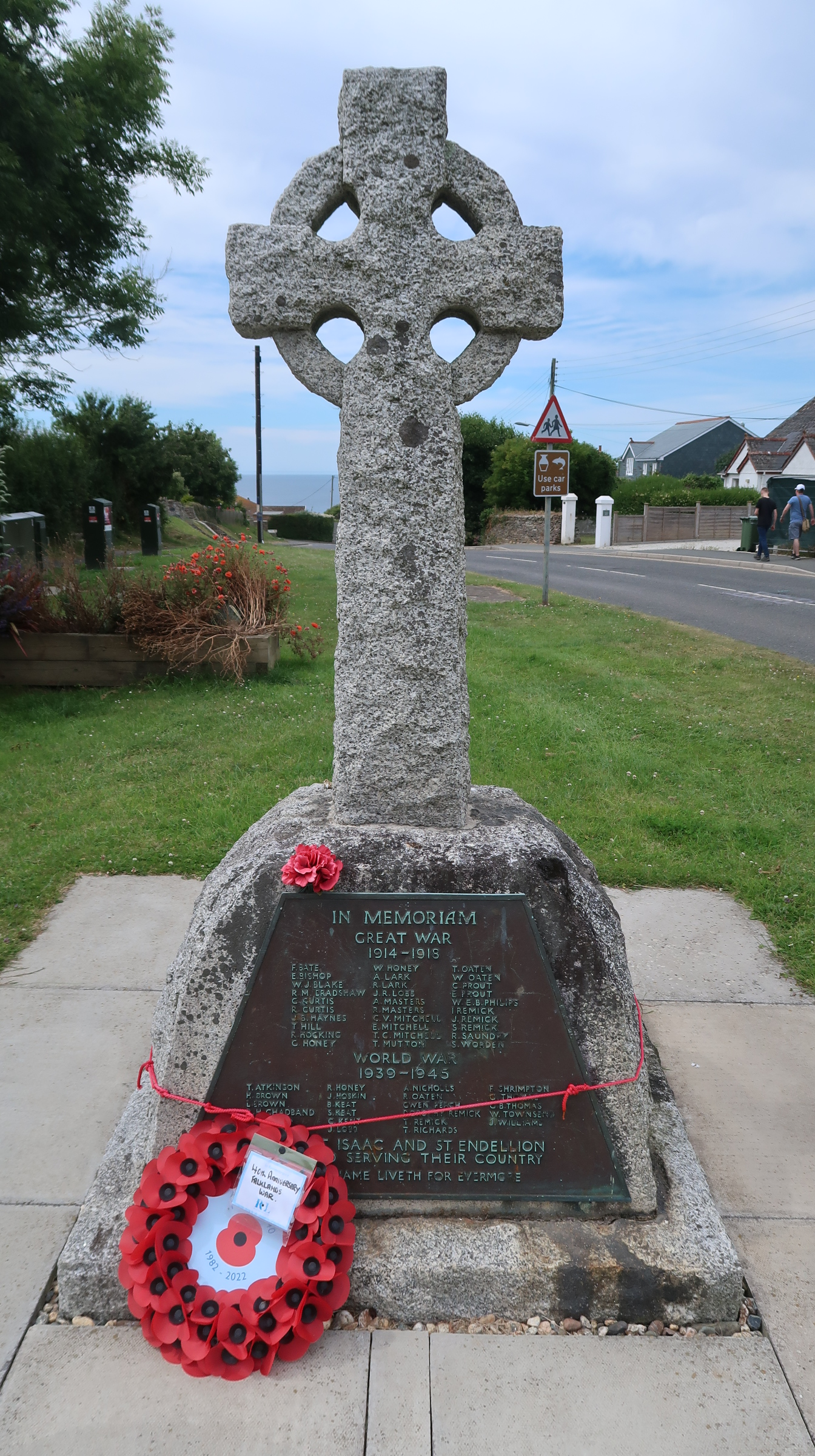
War Memorial listed Grade II for architectural and historic significance

The origins of Port Isaac are likely Celtic and the development of the village can be roughly divided into three phases. Through the Middle Ages and up to the coming of the railways, Port Isaac was a thriving port serving the area inland. During the Tudor period the harbour was dredged, a good illustration of its importance. Once goods from locations further inland were better served by the North Cornwall Railway, the economy of the port relied on pilchard fishing, probably a centuries-old industry. However, the pilchard shoals began to decline, and after World War I tourism became the mainstay of the economy.

== Port ==
Port Isaac's pier was constructed during the reign of Henry VIII. A 1937 historian said, "...Tudor pier and breakwater have now yielded to a strong new sea-wall balanced by an arm on the opposite side of the cove, and we do not doubt that the fishermen sleep more soundly in their beds on stormy nights." The village centre dates from the 18th and 19th centuries, from a time when its prosperity was tied to local coastal freight and fishing. Apart from the corn that gave the town its name, the port handled cargoes of coal, wood, stone, ores, limestone, salt, pottery and heavy goods which were conveyed along its narrow streets. Small coastal sailing vessels were built below Roscarrock Hill.

The pilchard fishery began here before the 16th century and in 1850 there were 49 registered fishing boats and four fish cellars. Fishermen still work from the Platt, landing their catches of fish, crab and lobsters. The historic core of the village was designated a Conservation Area in 1971 and North Cornwall District Council reviewed this in 2008 with the endorsement of a detailed Port Isaac Conservation Area Appraisal document and a related Conservation Area Management Plan. The village has around 90 listed buildings (all Grade II).

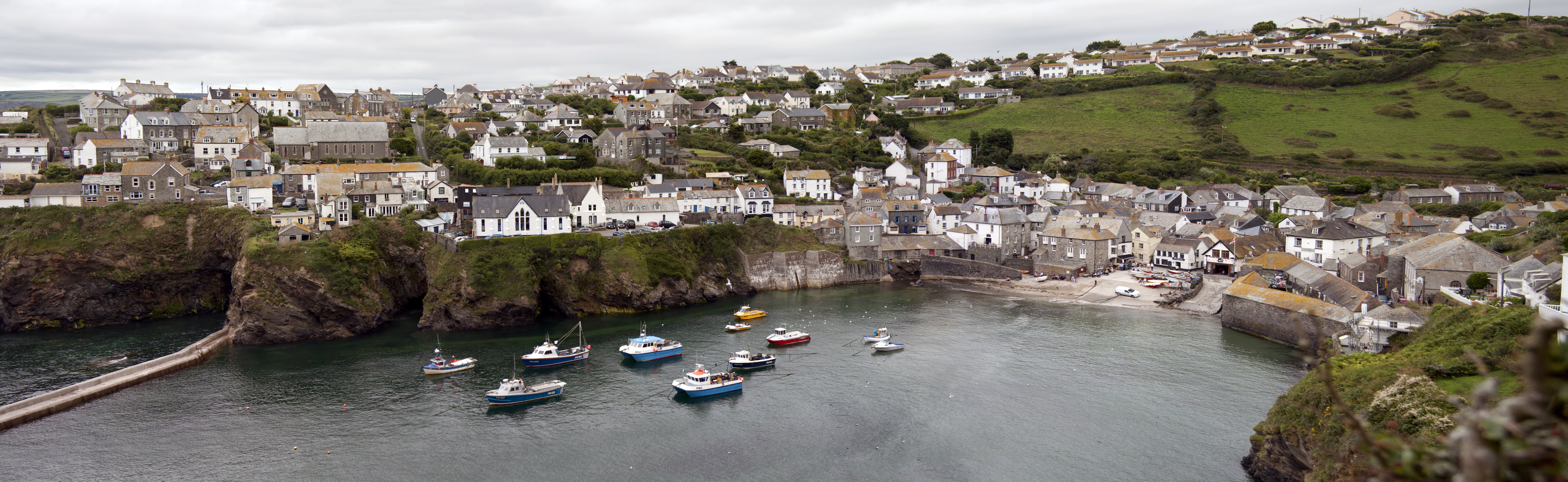
Port Isaac viewed from the west

== Lifeboat ==
A Royal National Lifeboat Institution (RNLI) lifeboat station was opened at Port Isaac in 1869. The Richard and Sarah was kept in a boat house on Fore Street, from where it had to be taken through the narrow streets of the village on a carriage to be launched. A new lifeboat station was built in 1927 next to the beach but this closed in 1933. An Inshore Lifeboat has been stationed at Port Isaac from 1967. Since 1993 it has been kept in the lifeboat station built in 1927; the original lifeboat station is now a shop. Port Isaac's lifeboat has been the D-class Copeland Bell since 2009.

== Transport ==
The first link from Port Isaac to the railways was started by John Prout, who ran a service to Bodmin Road station, more than 10 miles (16 km) distant, from 1861. The railways came much closer when the North Cornwall Railway opened the section from Delabole to Wadebridge in 1895, which included a station at Port Isaac Road 4 miles (6 km) from the village. Produce from the area, including fish, flowers and fruit, was transported through the steep and narrow lanes to the station, with 150 tons of fish being transported by cart for onward shipment in 1897.

The horse-drawn connection to the railway was replaced by a motor bus in 1920, and when this service was taken over by the Southern National Omnibus Company in 1930, Prouts merged the passenger service into the freight cartage service that they ran for the Southern Railway. The Okehampton to Wadebridge railway line closed in 1966. Due to the sparsely populated area, ticket sales were always low: 4,500 annually in 1928, dropping to less than 2,000 in 1936; freight dropped in a similar way over the same period.

The village was served by Western Greyhound's 584 bus service from Wadebridge to Camelford, which ran five times daily in each direction, except for Sundays. A summer Sunday service provided up to four return journeys.

In 1997, FirstGroup route 96 provided five buses each way, between Wadebridge and Bude.

Newquay Airport, located in Newquay, is the closest airport to the village.

In 2016, a local taxi service – Port Isaac Shuttle Service – was asked to change the way that it displayed its name after Cornwall Council deemed it offended good taste.

== Recreation and tourism ==
Port Isaac is located on the South West Coast Path, and apart from people walking the 630 miles (1,010 km) long National Trail there are shorter walks in the area using this path as part of their route.

There is an alley in Port Isaac, known as Temple Bar, that is particularly narrow. "At the narrowest point Temple Bar is only 18 inches wide." In the 1978 edition of Guinness Book of Records, it was dubbed the world's narrowest thoroughfare. Locals refer to it as Squeeze-belly (or Squeeze-ee-belly) Alley.

== Places of worship ==
The church of St Peter was built as a chapel-of-ease in the parish of St Endellion in 1882–84; Port Isaac became a separate parish in 1913, though more recently it has returned to St Endellion parish. The church is built of granite and stone and the style adopted was Early English.

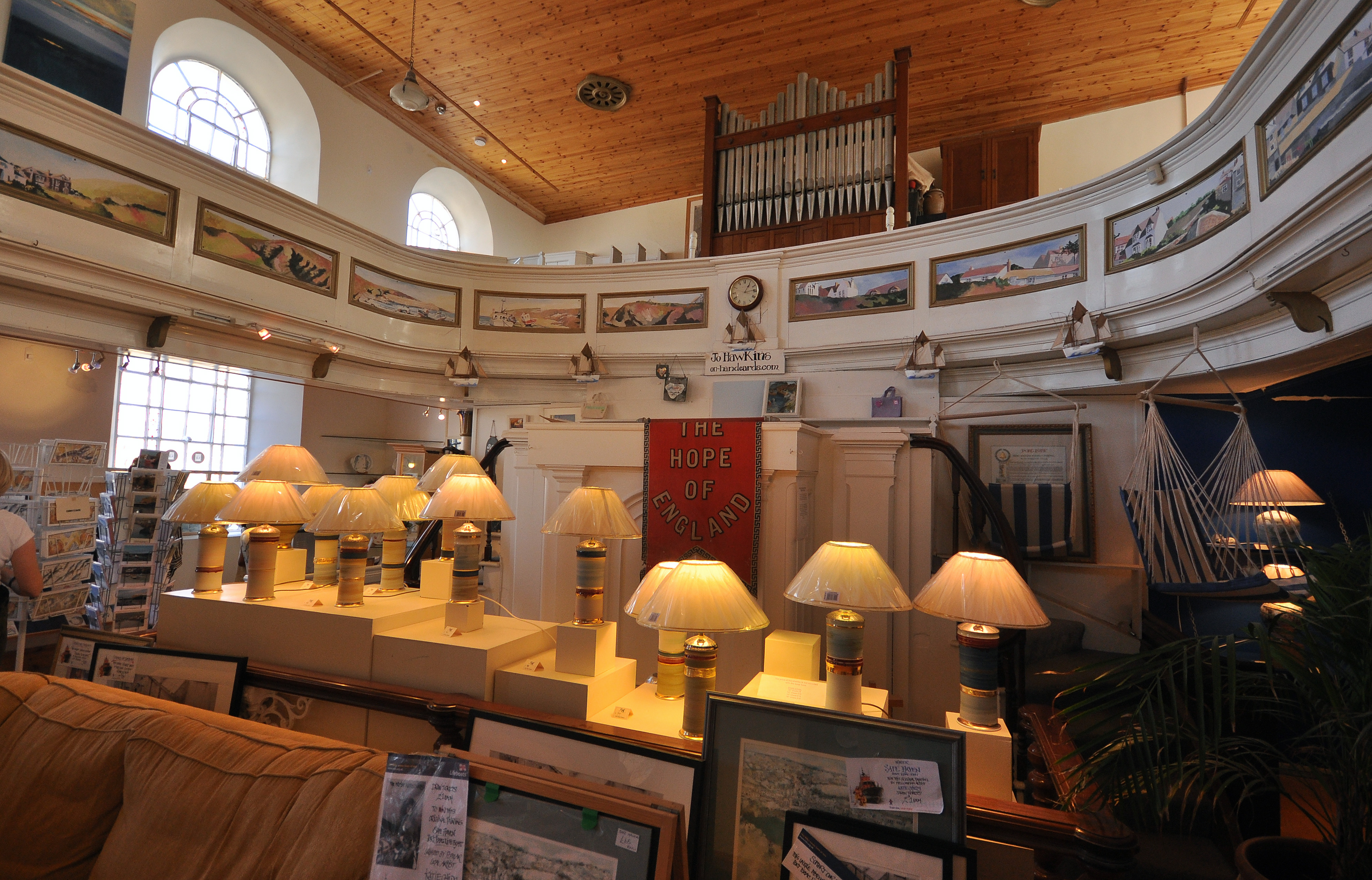
A former Methodist chapel converted into a pottery and art gallery

The village has had three Nonconformist places of worship: the oldest was a Quaker meeting house, 1806; from 1832 it was used by the Baptists but was converted to a dwelling house in 1871. The United Methodist chapel (1846) and the Wesleyan Methodist chapel are both now closed. The nearest Roman Catholic church is in Tintagel.

== Cornish wrestling ==
Cornish wrestling tournaments, for prizes, were held in Port Isaac at the football field.

== Notable people ==
- Edmund Henry Hambly (1914 in Port Isaac – 1985) a British orthopaedic surgeon, politician and promoter of the Cornish language
- Fisherman's Friends (active 1995–present), a male a cappella group who sing sea shanties

== Filming location ==
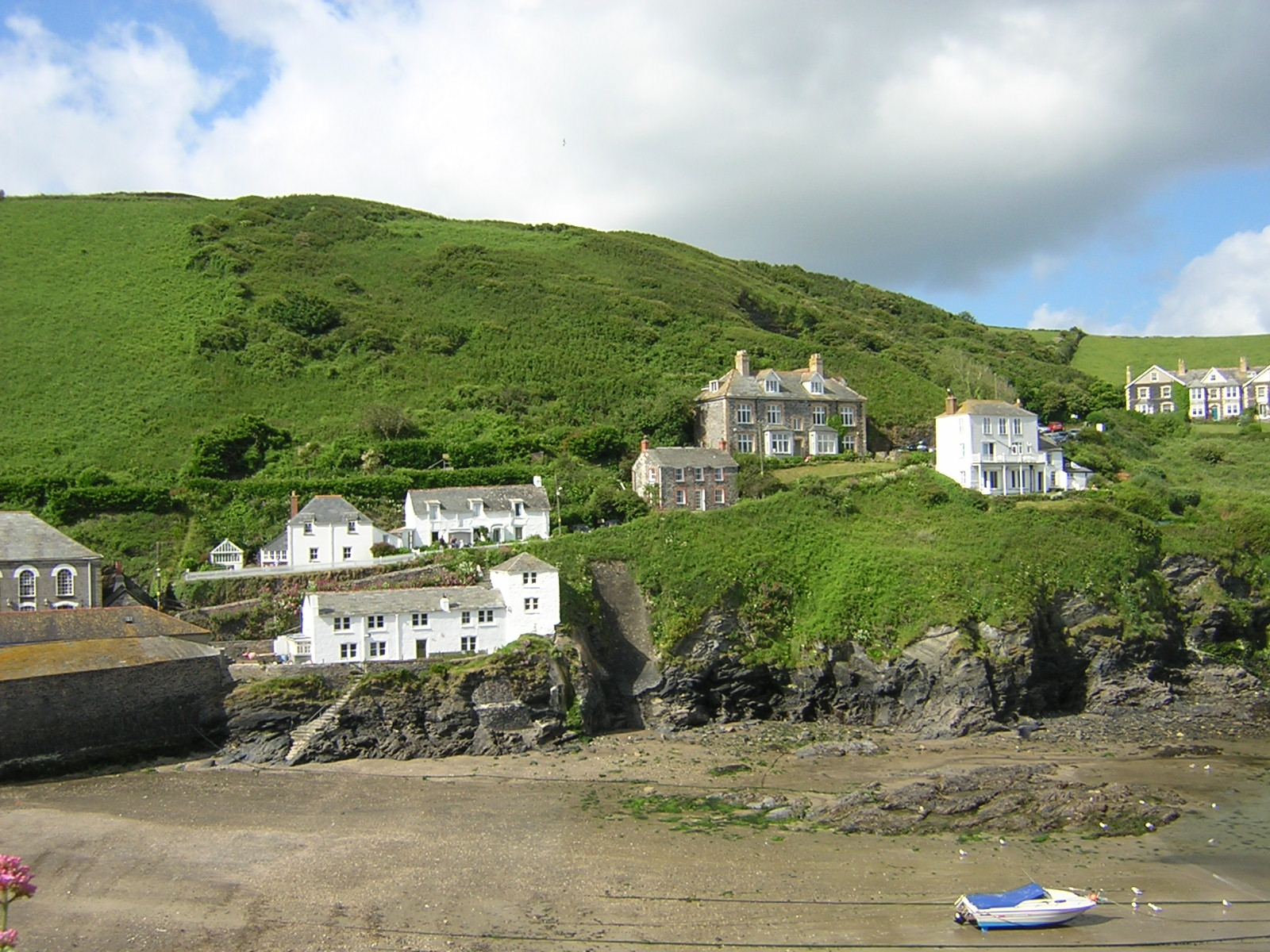
View of Doc Martin's fictional home, real name Fern Cottage, shown in the centre of the picture

Locations in and around the village have been used for a number of films and television series, including:

- Poldark (1975–77), a BBC television series, used locations in the area.
- Tarry-Dan Tarry-Dan Scarey Old Spooky Man (1978), BBC supernatural play.
- The Nightmare Man (1981), BBC drama serial, filmed in and around the village – which doubled for a Scottish island.
- Oscar and Lucinda (1997), film.
- Saving Grace (2000), a comedy film, was filmed in and around the village.
- DIY SOS (2001), featured the village hall being decorated.
- Doc Martin (2004–2022), ITV series, ten series filmed in the port (using the fictional name of "Portwenn"; also used in the Sky Pictures movies Doc Martin and Doc Martin and the Legend of the Cloutie under its true name "Port Isaac").
- The Shell Seekers (2006), a television production with Vanessa Redgrave, where the village was used as the backdrop and many scenes were shot in the main street.
- Fisherman’s Friends (2019), a film about the shanty-singing band of the same name and its sequel Fisherman's Friends: One and All (2022).

== Gallery ==
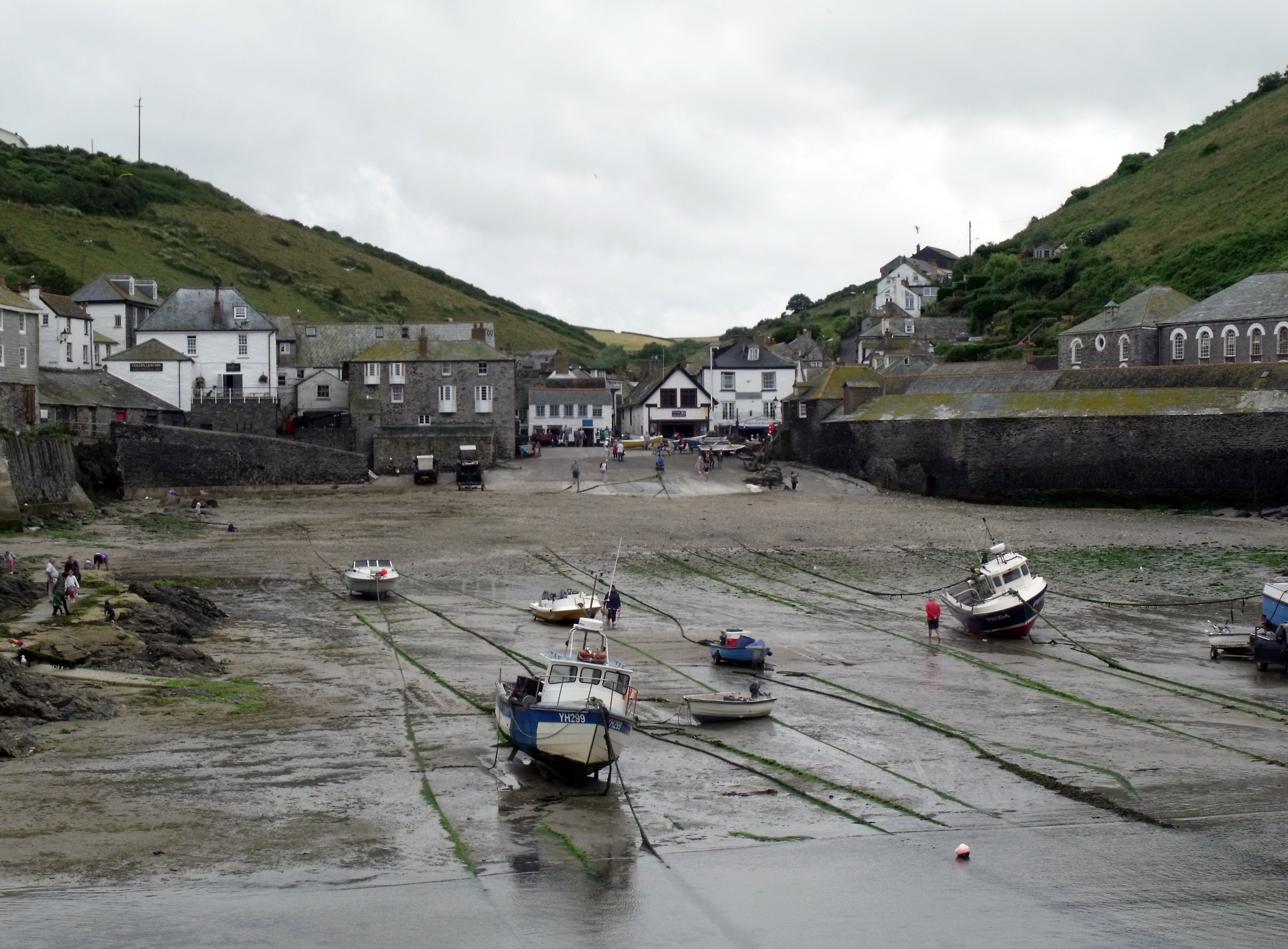
Beach at Port Isaac

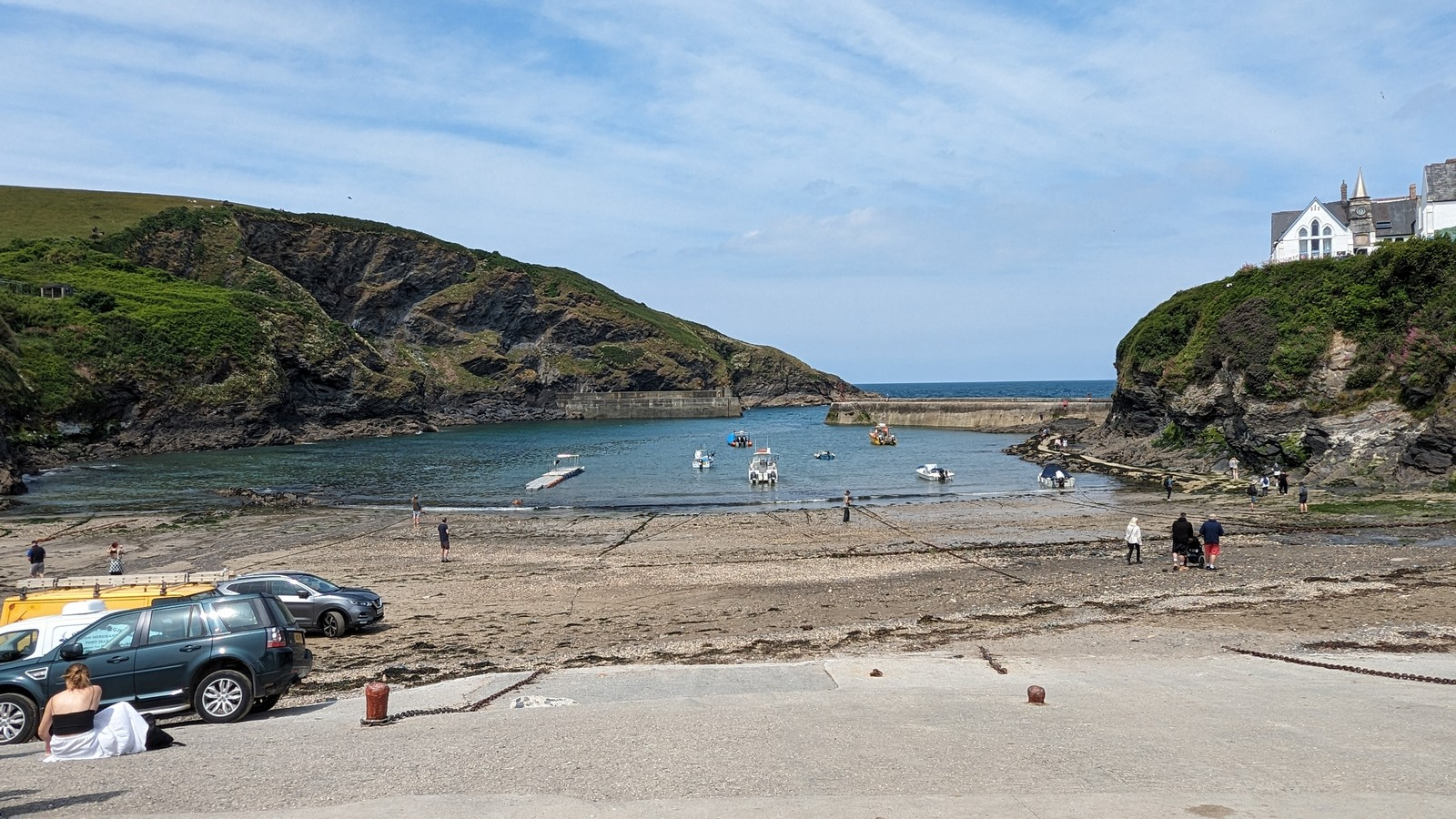
Harbour view from the beach

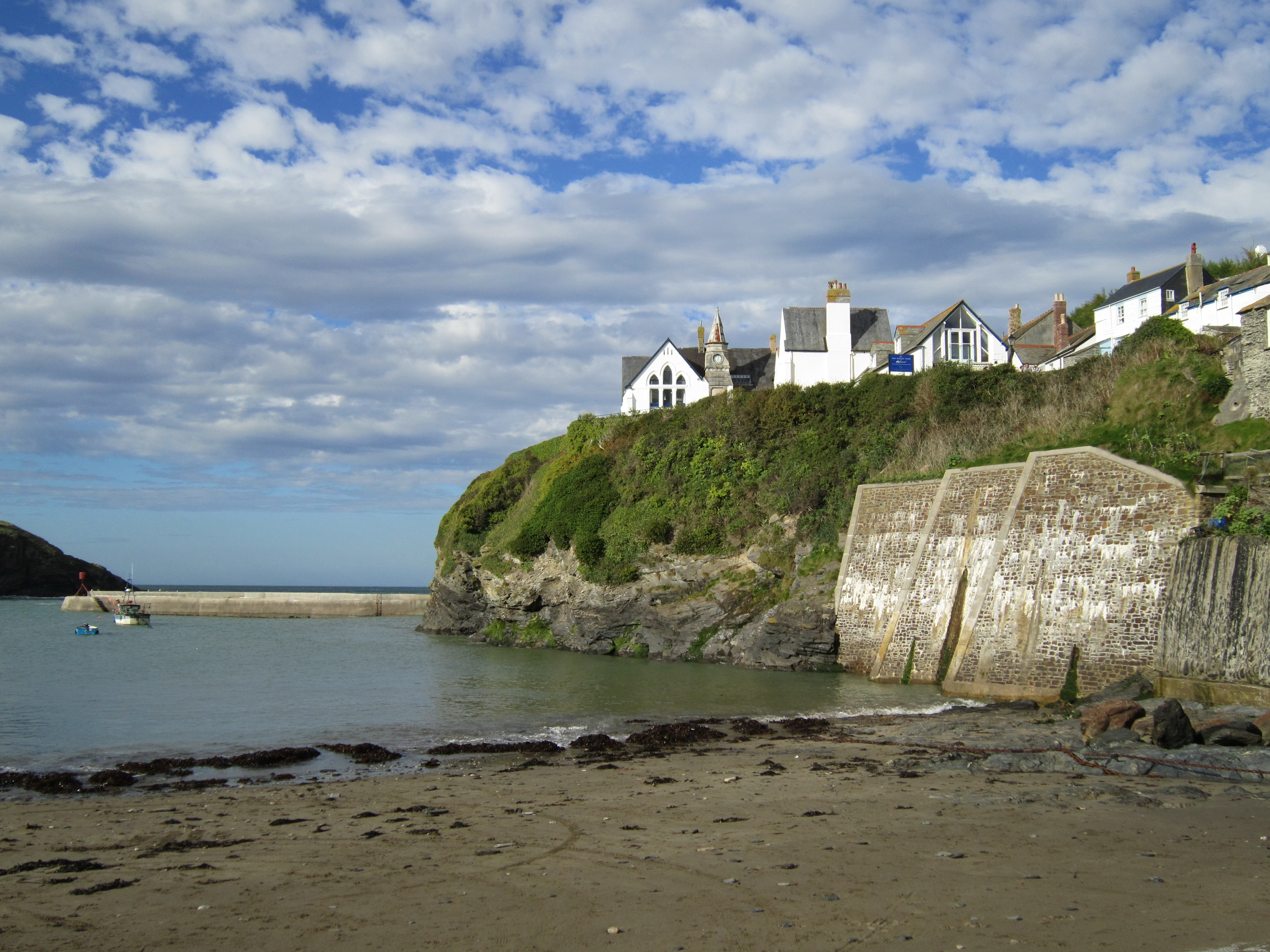
Buildings overlooking the harbour

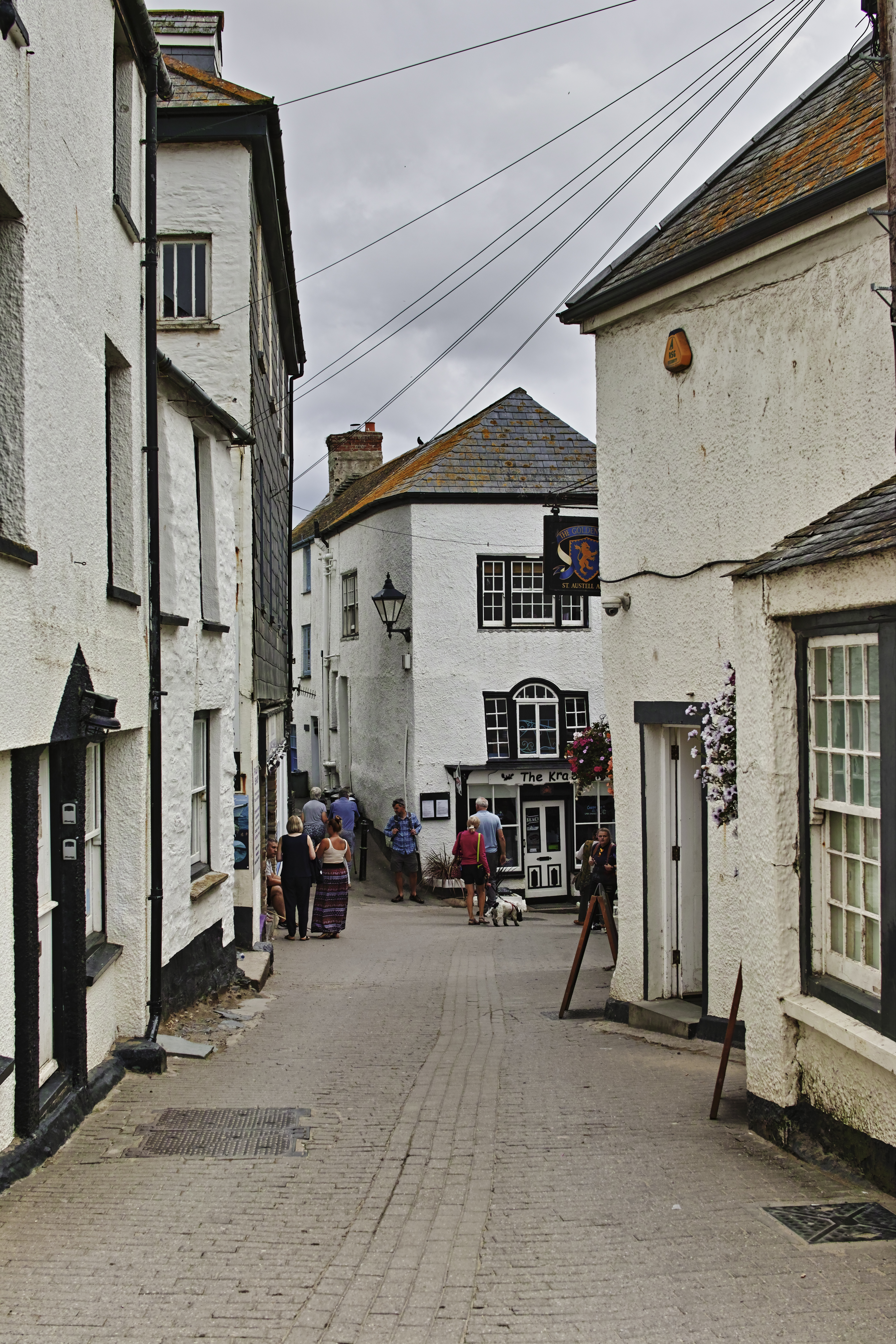
Narrow street in Port Isaac

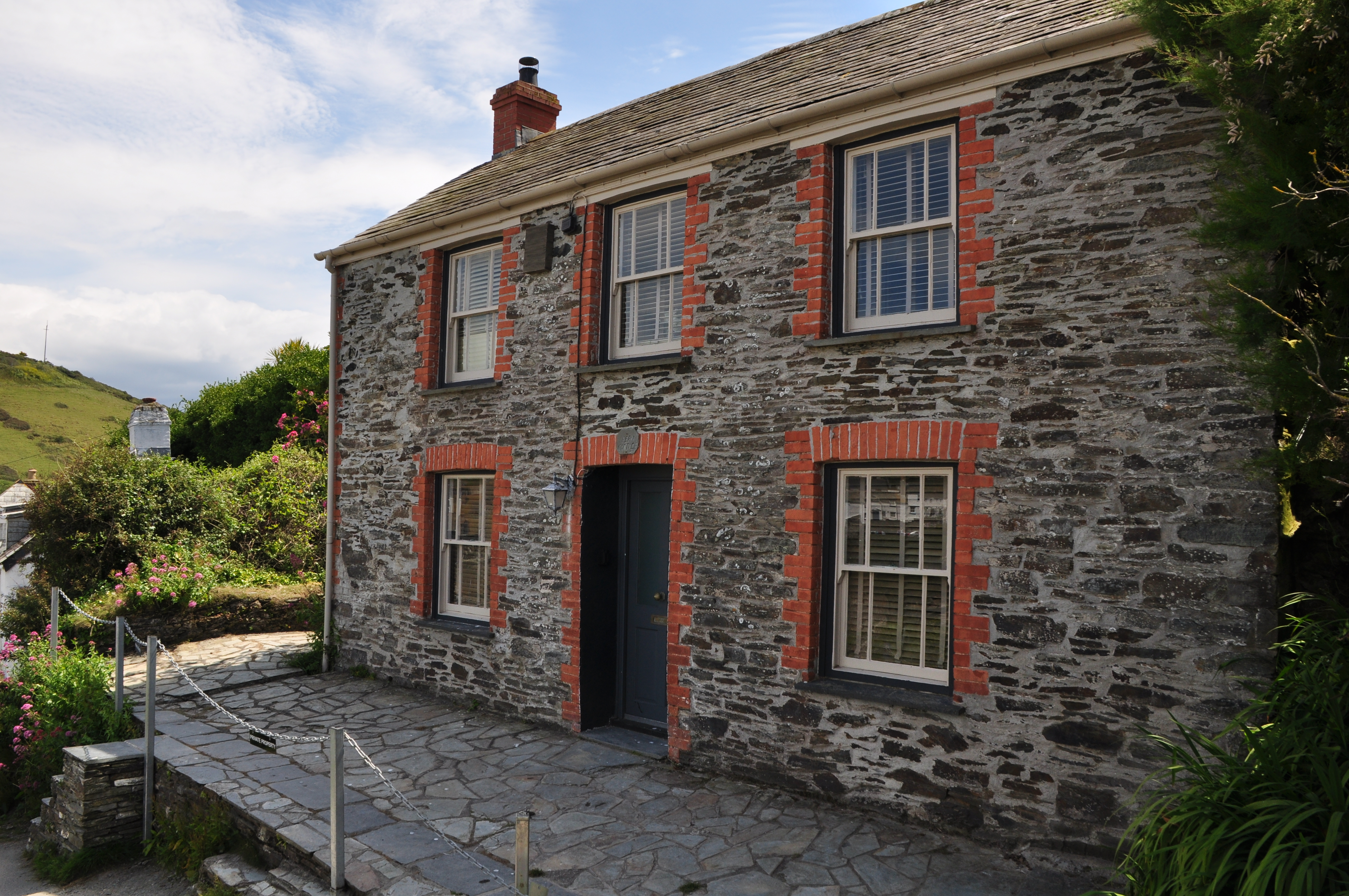
Fern Cottage, which appeared in Doc Martin

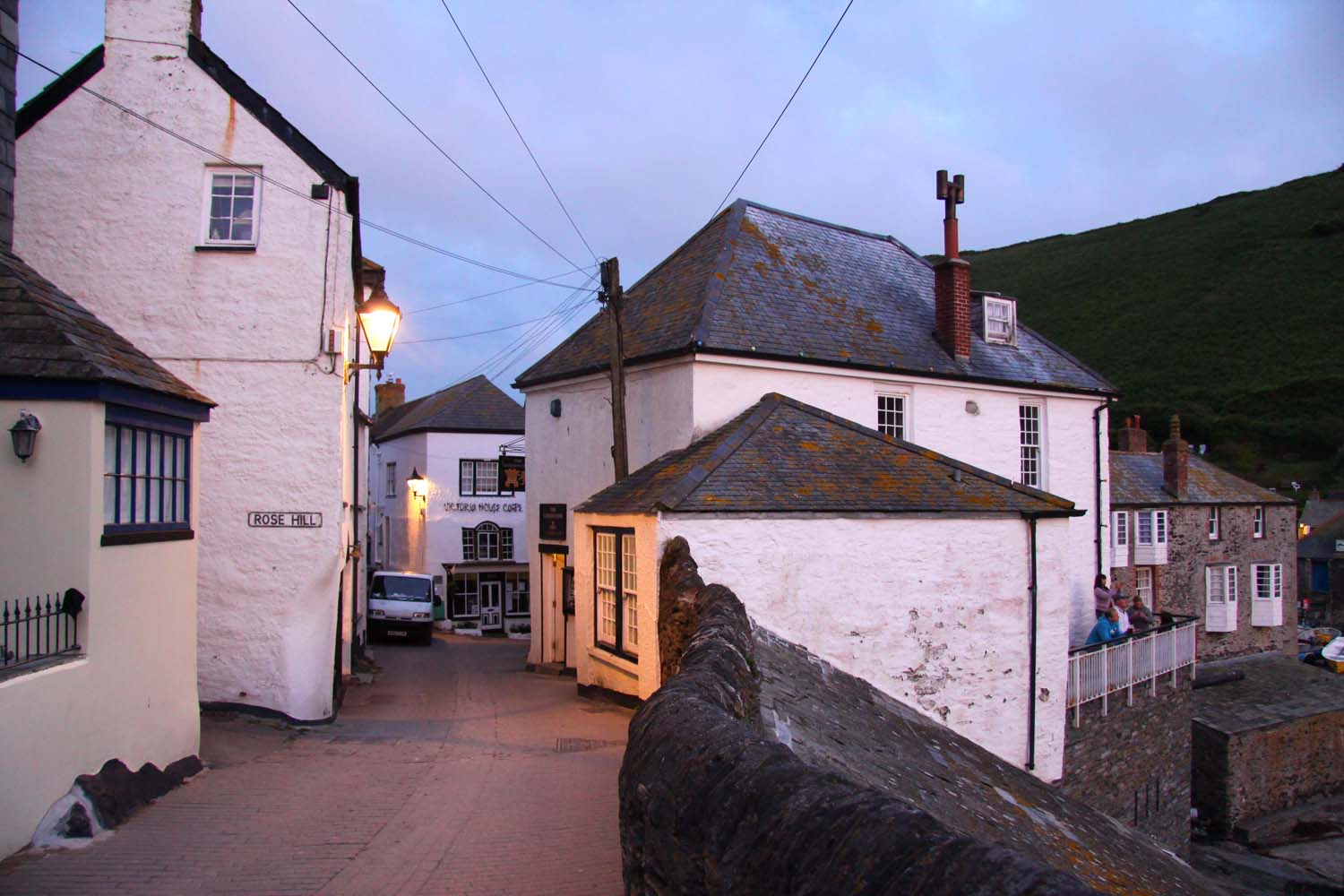
The Golden Lion Inn

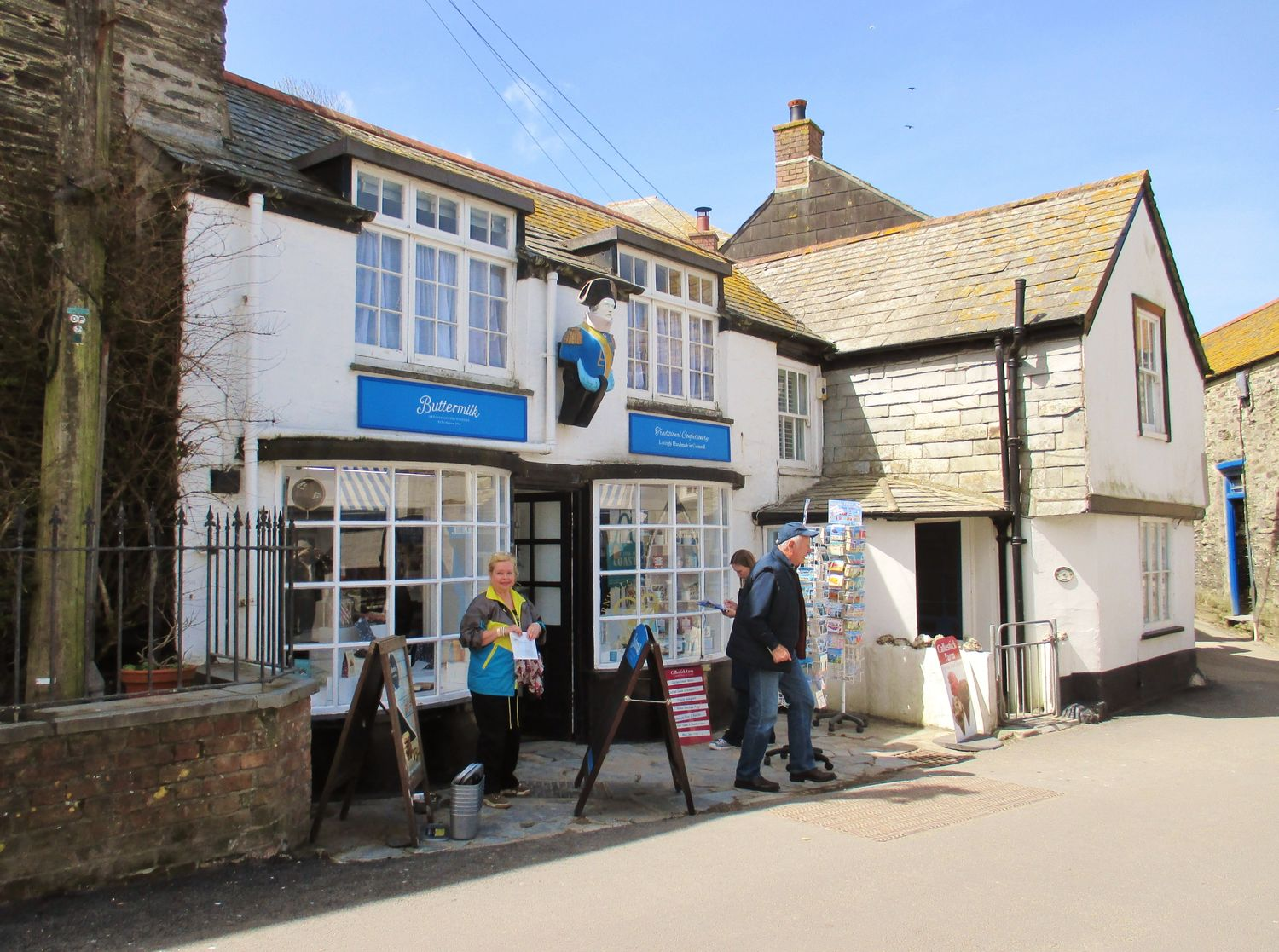
Shops in Port Isaac

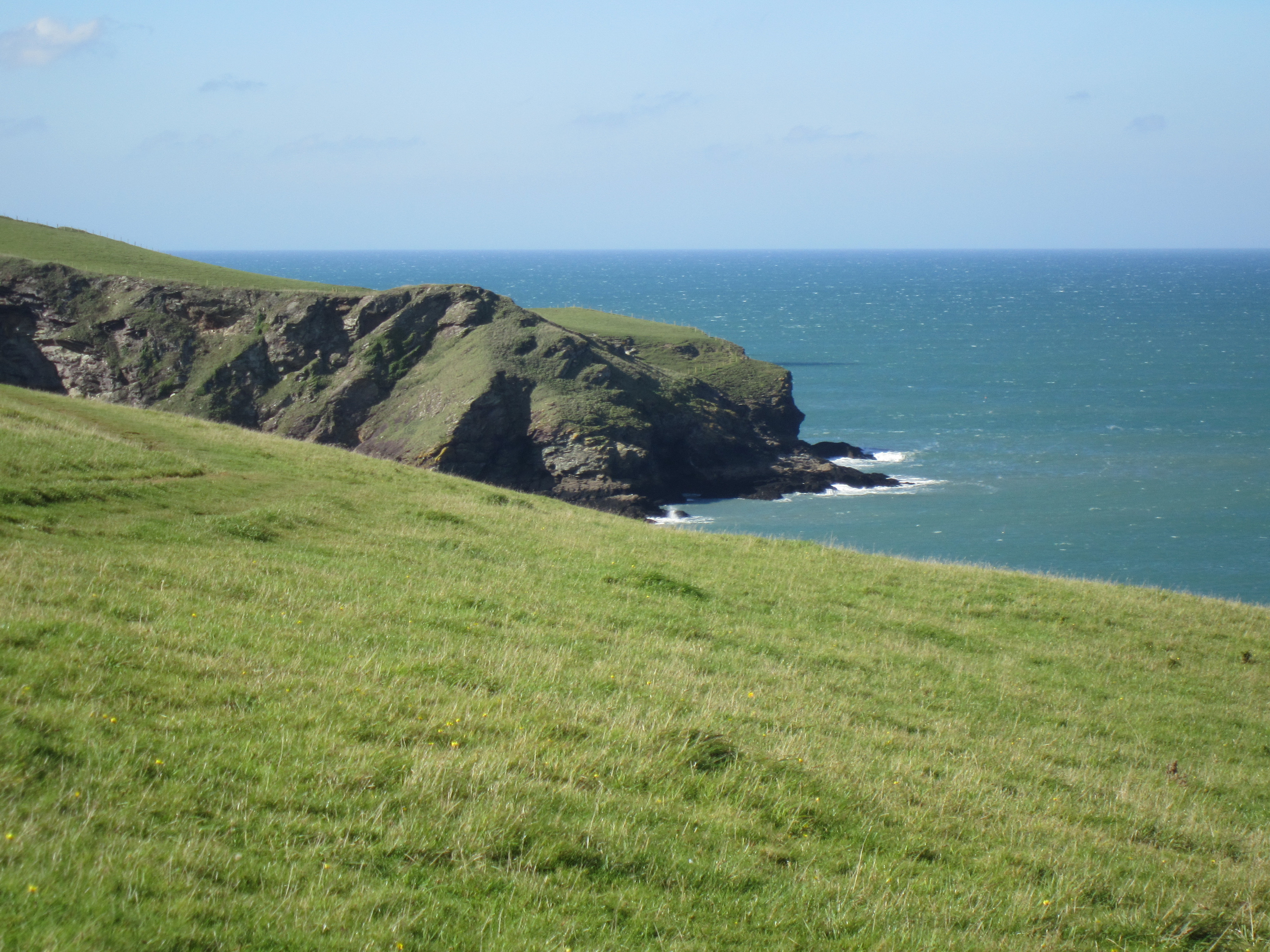
Port Isaac Hills

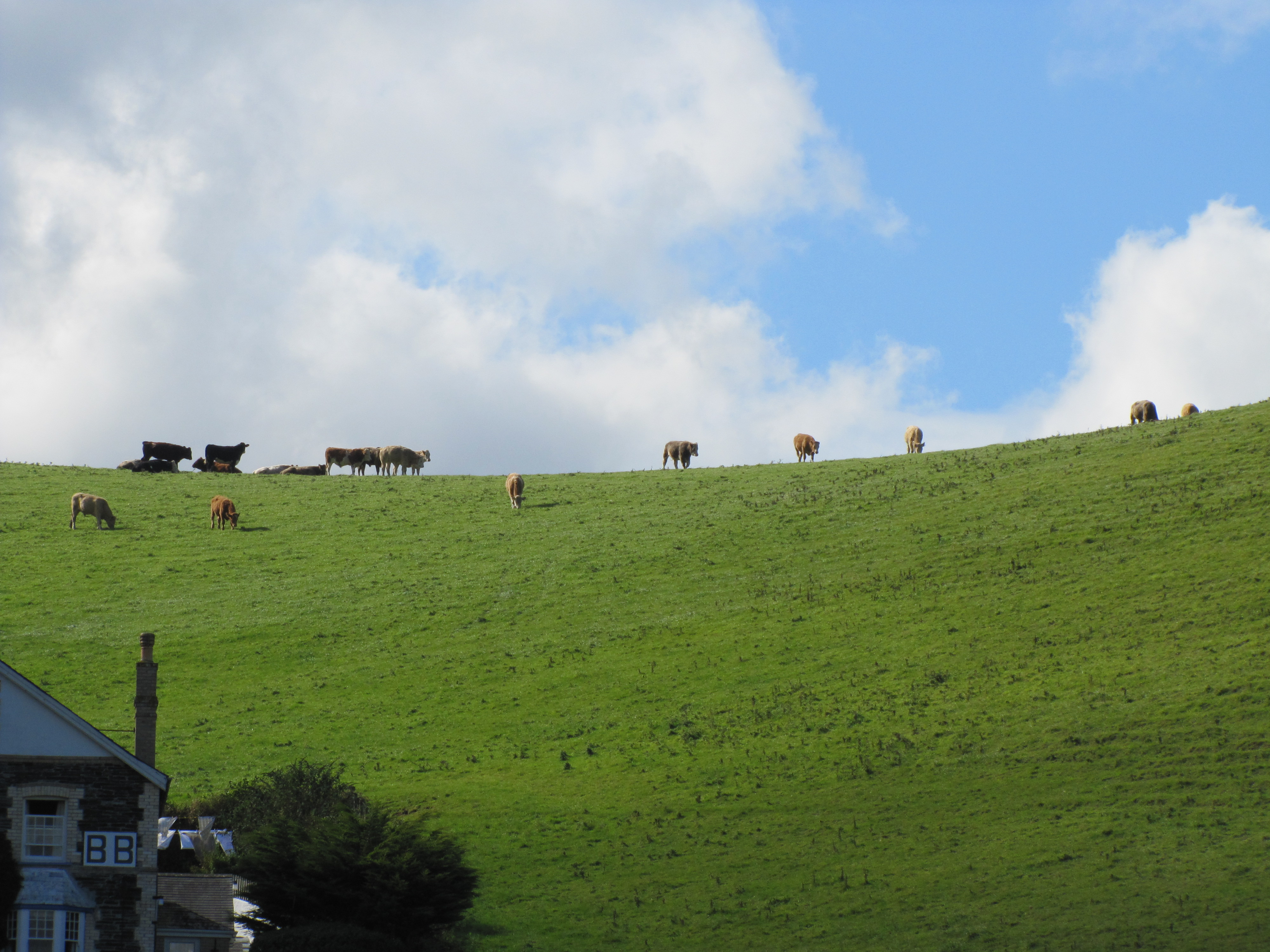
Cattle in Port Isaac

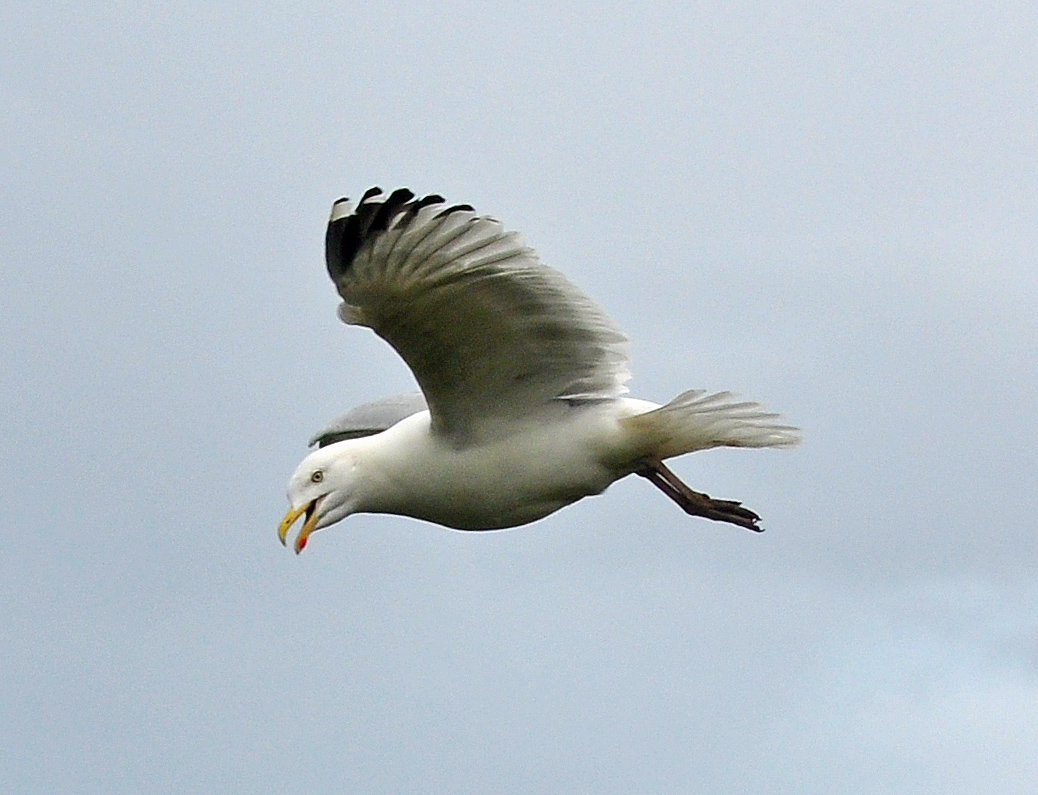
Herring gull in Port Isaac
