= Trelights =

Coordinates: 50.5778°N 4.8396°W

Trelights: Cornish: Treleghrys
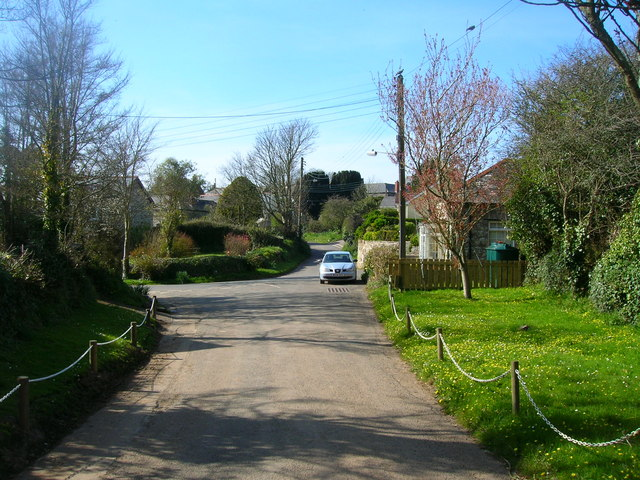
- Trelights

- Location within Cornwall
- OS grid reference: SW991792
- Civil parish: St Endellion
- Unitary authority: Cornwall
- Ceremonial county: Cornwall
- Region: South West
- Country: England
- Sovereign state: United Kingdom
- Post town: PORT ISAAC
- Postcode district: PL29
- Dialling code: 01208
- Police: Devon and Cornwall
- Fire: Cornwall
- Ambulance: South Western
- UK Parliament: North Cornwall

Trelights (Cornish: Treleghrys) is a hamlet in North Cornwall, England, United Kingdom and is situated in the civil parish of St Endellion, 5 miles (8.0 km) north of the town of Wadebridge.

Trelights lies within the Cornwall Area of Outstanding Natural Beauty (AONB).
