= Golden Lion, Port Isaac =

Pub in Port Isaac, England

Golden Lion
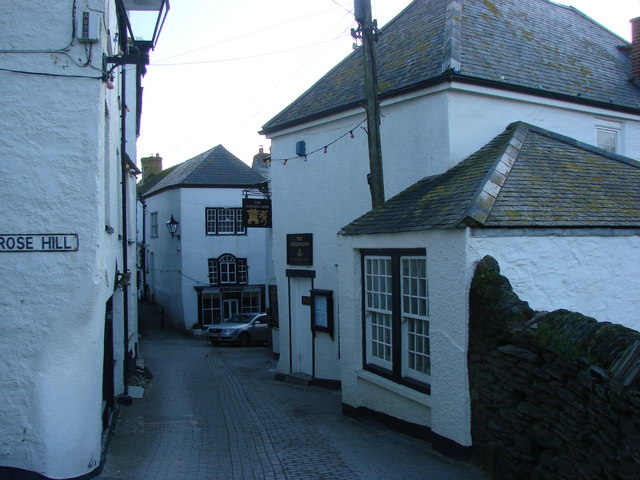
- The building in 2009, looking south along Fore Street

- Location within Cornwall Location within the United Kingdom

General information
- Type: Public house
- Location: 10 Fore Street, Port Isaac, Cornwall, England
- Coordinates: 50.592431°N 4.831723°W
- Completed: Early 19th century

Website
- thegoldenlionportisaac.co.uk

The Golden Lion is a public house on Fore Street in the English fishing village of Port Isaac, Cornwall. Believed to date from at least the early 19th century, the building may have earlier origins (with claims of its being 18th- and 17th century). It is a Grade II listed building.

The main ground floor contains a snug bar, a main bar and a balcony overlooking the harbour.

The Bones Bar, separate from the main bar area, is located on the lower ground floor. In there, a section of glassed flooring shows an old passageway that was allegedly a storage area used by smugglers. A door from the bar exits to an area called The Gun Deck, where a gun from the SS Milly can be seen. The vessel was sunk by a German U-boat in 1918 during World War I.

Private rooms, for rental, are on the third floor.

The pub has featured as the "Crab & Lobster" for the television series Doc Martin and the "local" for the film The Fisherman's Friends.

In August 2021, the pub's landlord, St Austell Brewery, was looking for a new licensee.

== Gallery ==
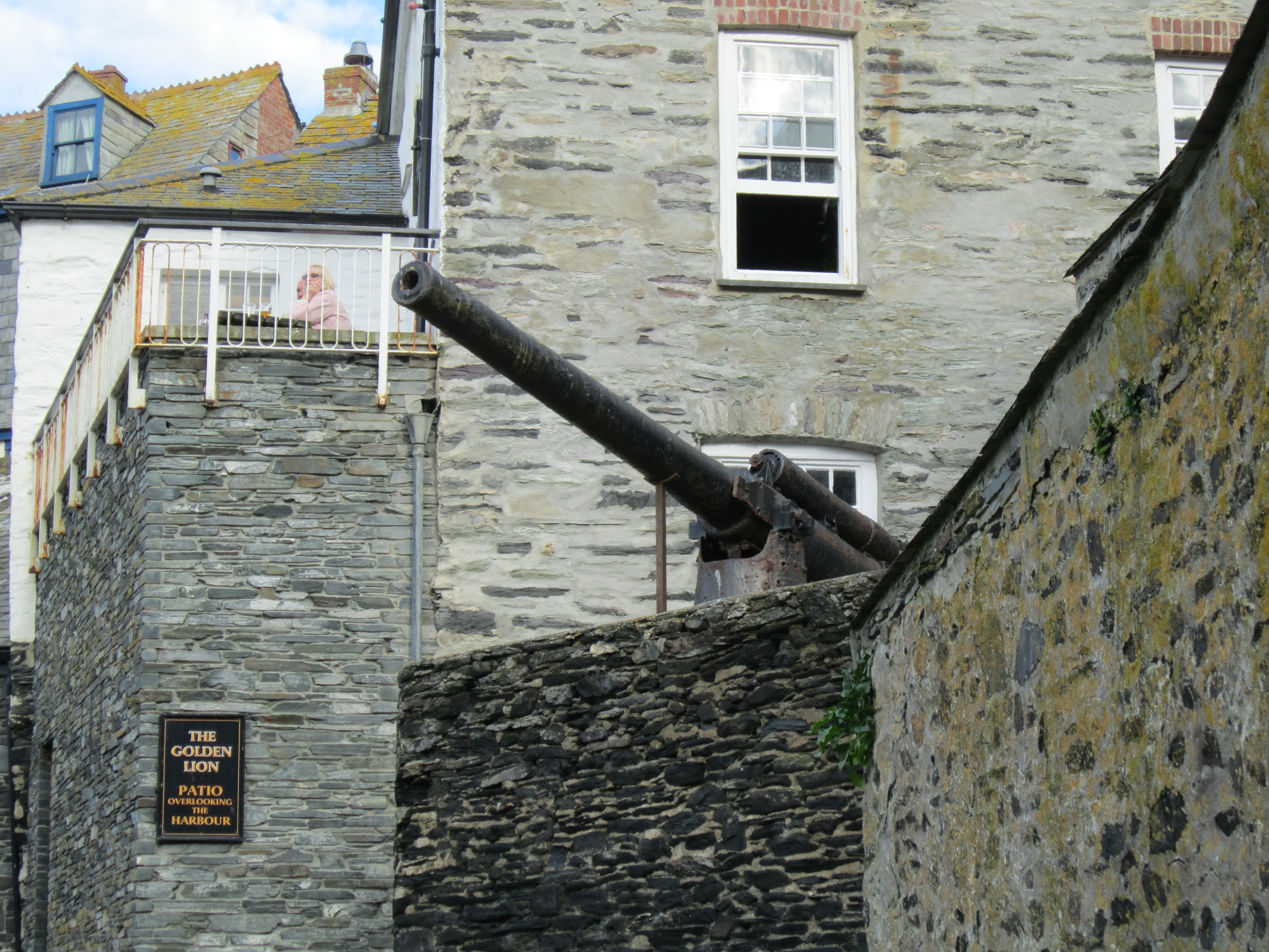
Gun recovered from the SS Milly, which sank off the coast in 1918

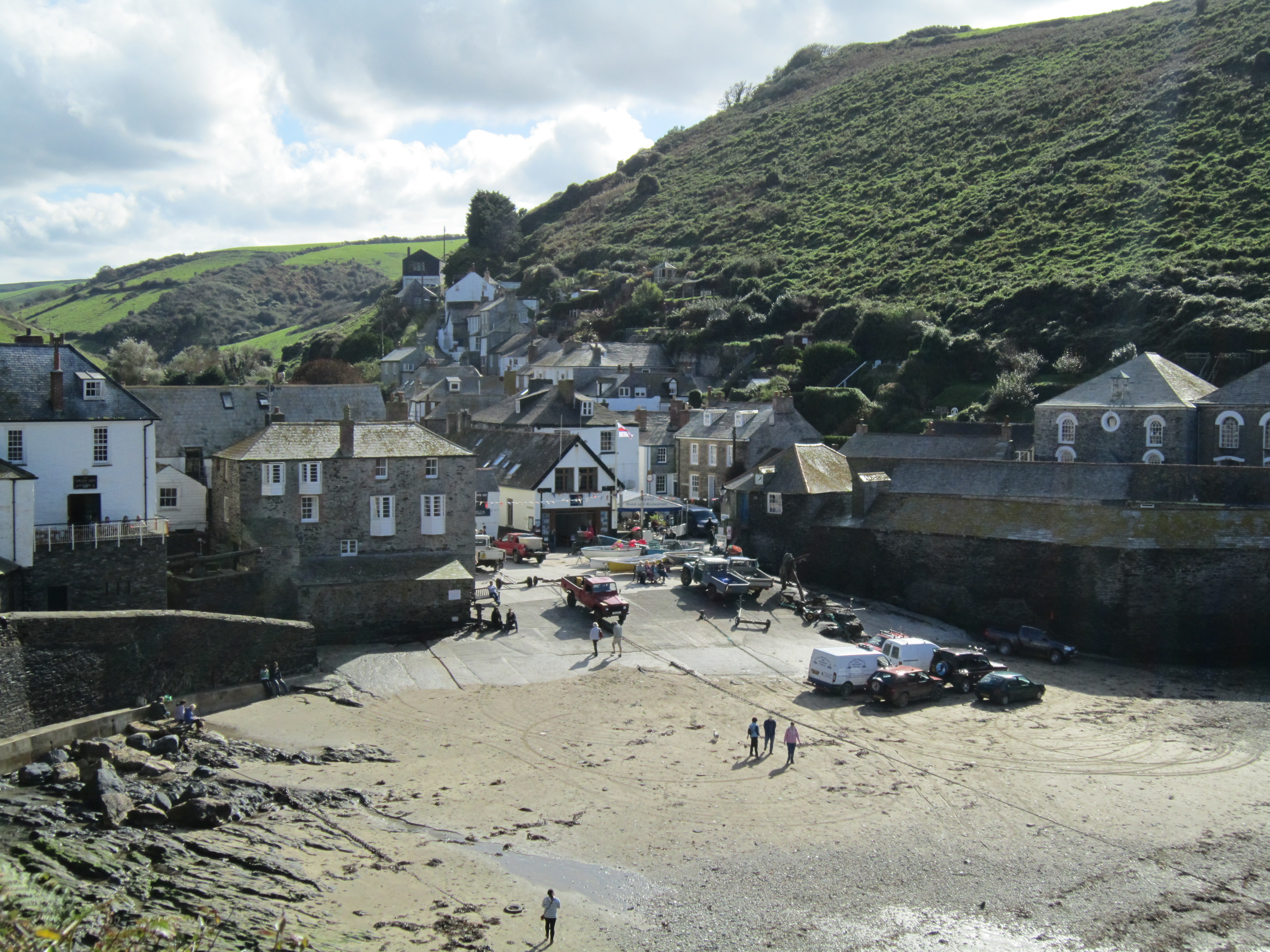
The rear of the pub (left) and its view of the harbour

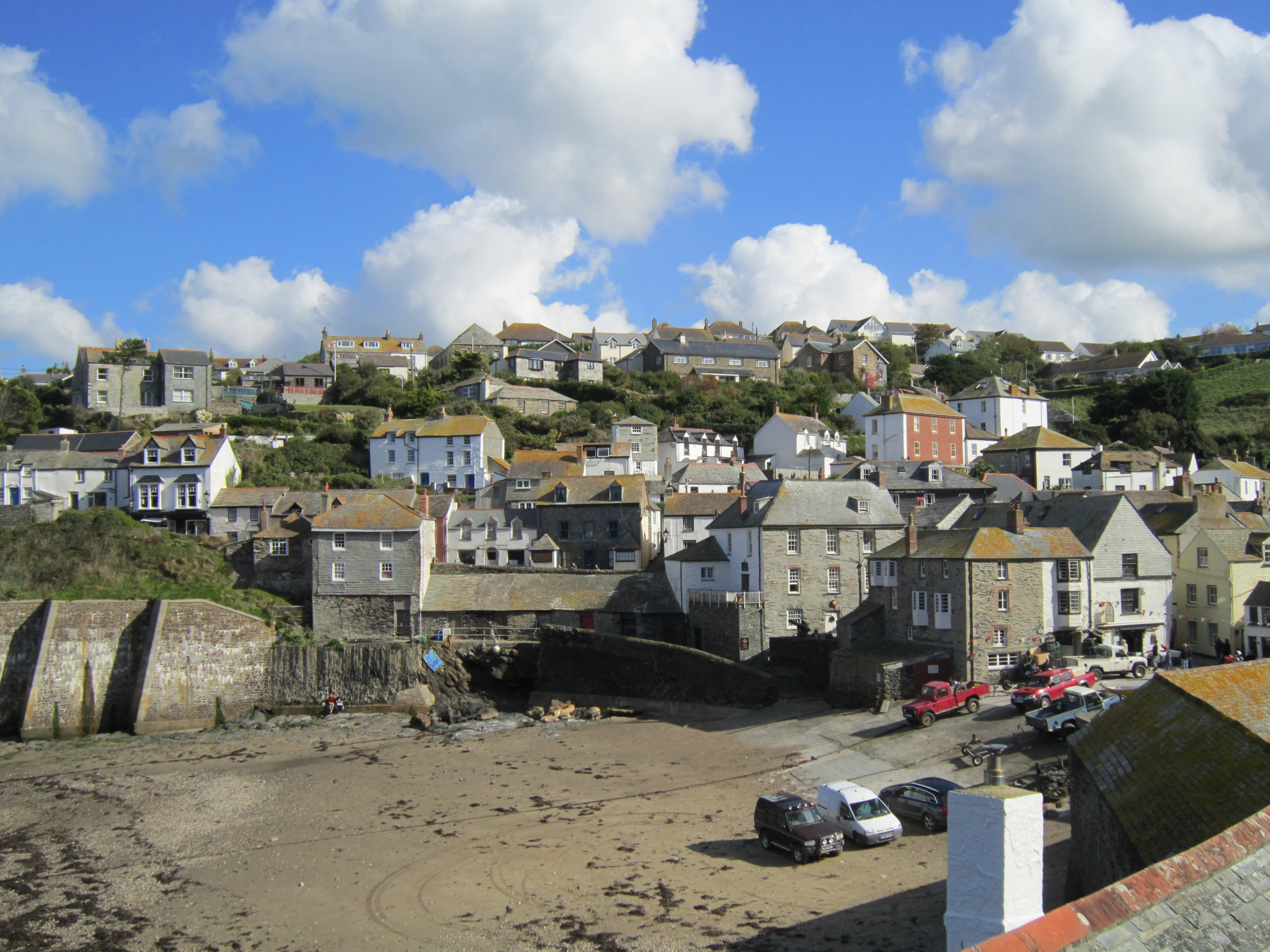
And viewed from the western side of the harbour (right of centre)
