= Endellion Quartet =

The Endellion String Quartet was a British string quartet, named after St Endellion in Cornwall.

== History ==
The quartet was formed in 1979 with the following original members:

- Andrew Watkinson, violin
- Louise Williams, violin
- Garfield Jackson, viola
- David Waterman, cello

In 1986, Ralph de Souza replaced Louise Williams as second violin of the quartet.

The Endellion Quartet became the quartet-in-residence at Cambridge University in 1992. The quartet regularly performed at such venues as Wigmore Hall. The quartet has commissioned new music from such composers as Sally Beamish, Prach Boondiskulchok, Jonathan Dove, and Giles Swayne. The quartet received the 1996 award for 'Best Chamber Ensemble' from the Royal Philharmonic Society. Their commercial recordings included a Beethoven album for Warner Classics and Jazz.

The Endellion Quartet had planned the 2019–2020 concert season as their farewell season. The COVID-19 pandemic prevented the quartet from performing their final scheduled concerts in the 2019–2020 season, as originally planned. In February 2021, the quartet decided not to reschedule these planned farewell concerts and to disband, with immediate effect.
