= St Endellion =

Civil parish in Cornwall, England

Coordinates: 50.573°N 4.830°W

St Endellion: Cornish: Sen Endelyn
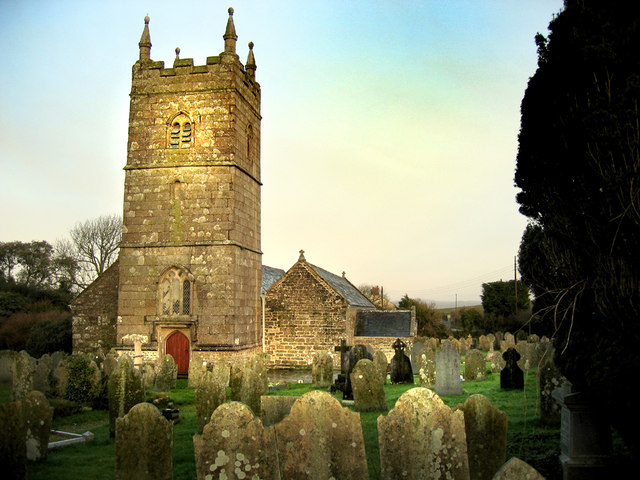

- Location within Cornwall
- Population: 987 (Civil Parish, 2011)
- OS grid reference: SW997786
- Civil parish: St Endellion
- Unitary authority: Cornwall
- Ceremonial county: Cornwall
- Region: South West
- Country: England
- Sovereign state: United Kingdom
- Post town: PORT ISAAC
- Postcode district: PL29
- Dialling code: 01208
- Police: Devon and Cornwall
- Fire: Cornwall
- Ambulance: South Western
- UK Parliament: North Cornwall

St Endellion (Cornish: Sen Endelyn) is a civil parish and hamlet in north Cornwall, England, United Kingdom. The hamlet and parish church are situated four miles (6.5 km) north of Wadebridge.

The parish takes its name from Saint Endelienta, who is said to have evangelised the district in the fifth century and to have been one of the children of King Brychan. Two wells near the church are named after her. The name is included in the electoral ward of St Minver and St Endellion, which includes Polzeath and Rock, with a population at the 2011 census of 3268.

== Geography and topography ==
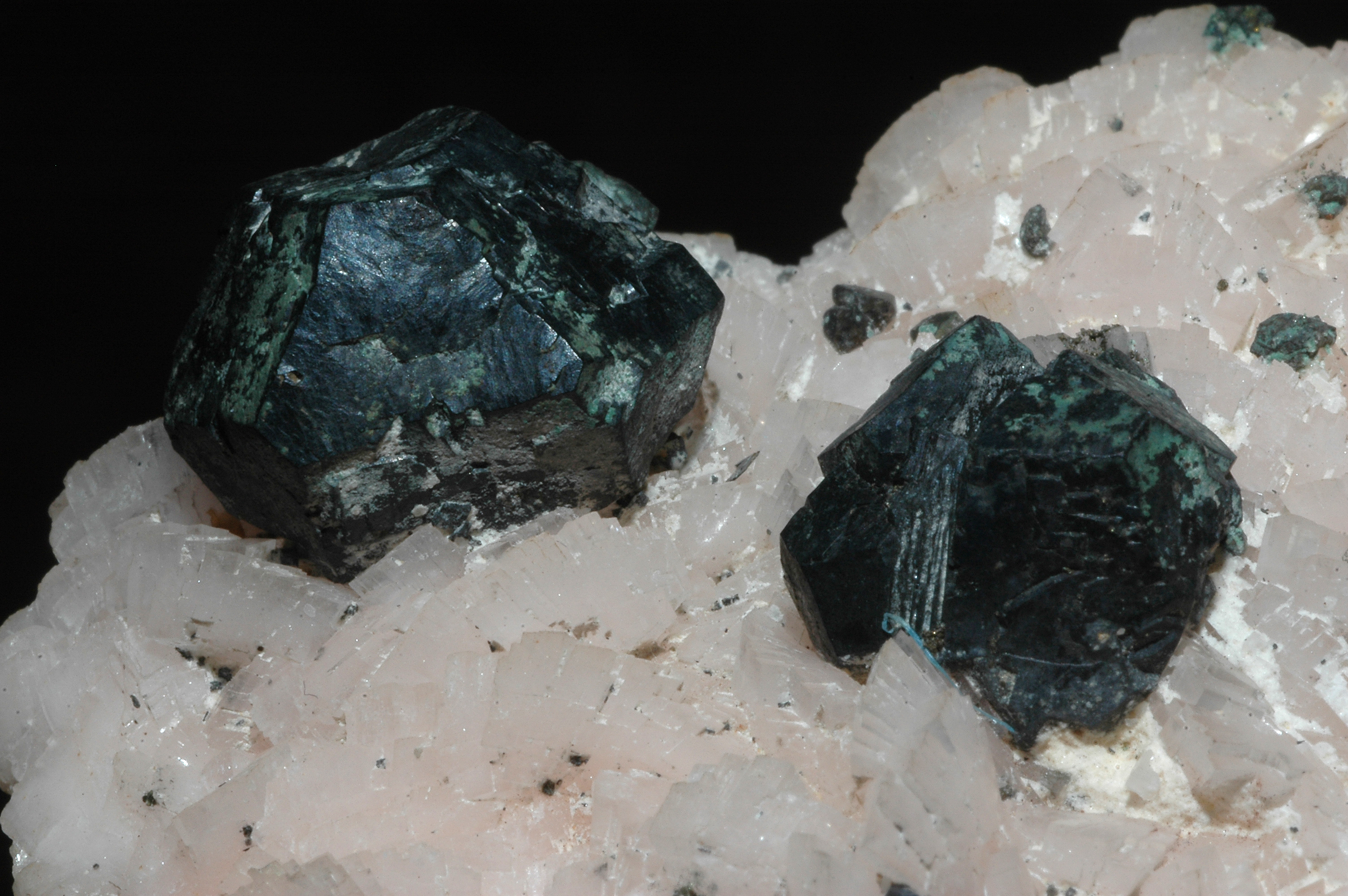
Bournonite (Endellionite) on dolomite

St Endellion is the Type Locality for the minerals bournonite (also known as Endellione or Endellionite) and barstowite.

St Endellion lies within the Cornwall National Landscape (AONB). Almost a third of Cornwall has AONB designation, with the same status and protection as a National Park.

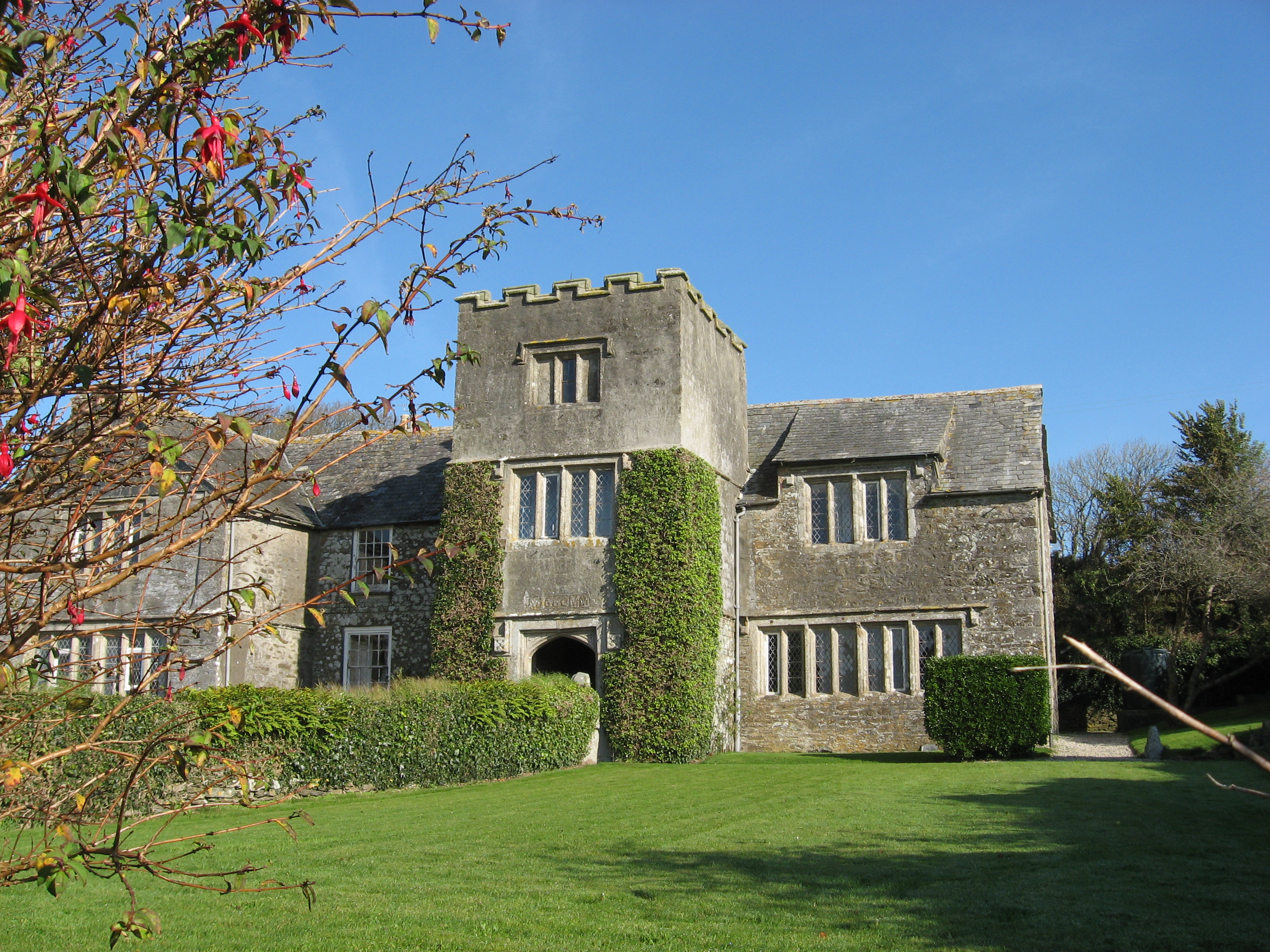
Tresungers Farm

The houses at Roscarrock and Tresungers are listed buildings: at Roscarrock part of the medieval house remains and is Grade I listed; Tresungers farmhouse was built in the late 16th century. The Roscarrock family included Nicholas Roscarrock, whose book is a source of information on some of the Cornish saints, and probably also Francis Roscarrock and other British MPs called Roscarrock. "Roscarrek Muer" is an early form of the place-name Roscarrock and it means "great rock roughland". In Beacham & Pevsner's Cornwall Roscarrock is described as "one of Cornwall's most memorable houses". It is the gentry house of the Roscarrocks who occupied it from the 11th century to 1673.

== Parish church ==
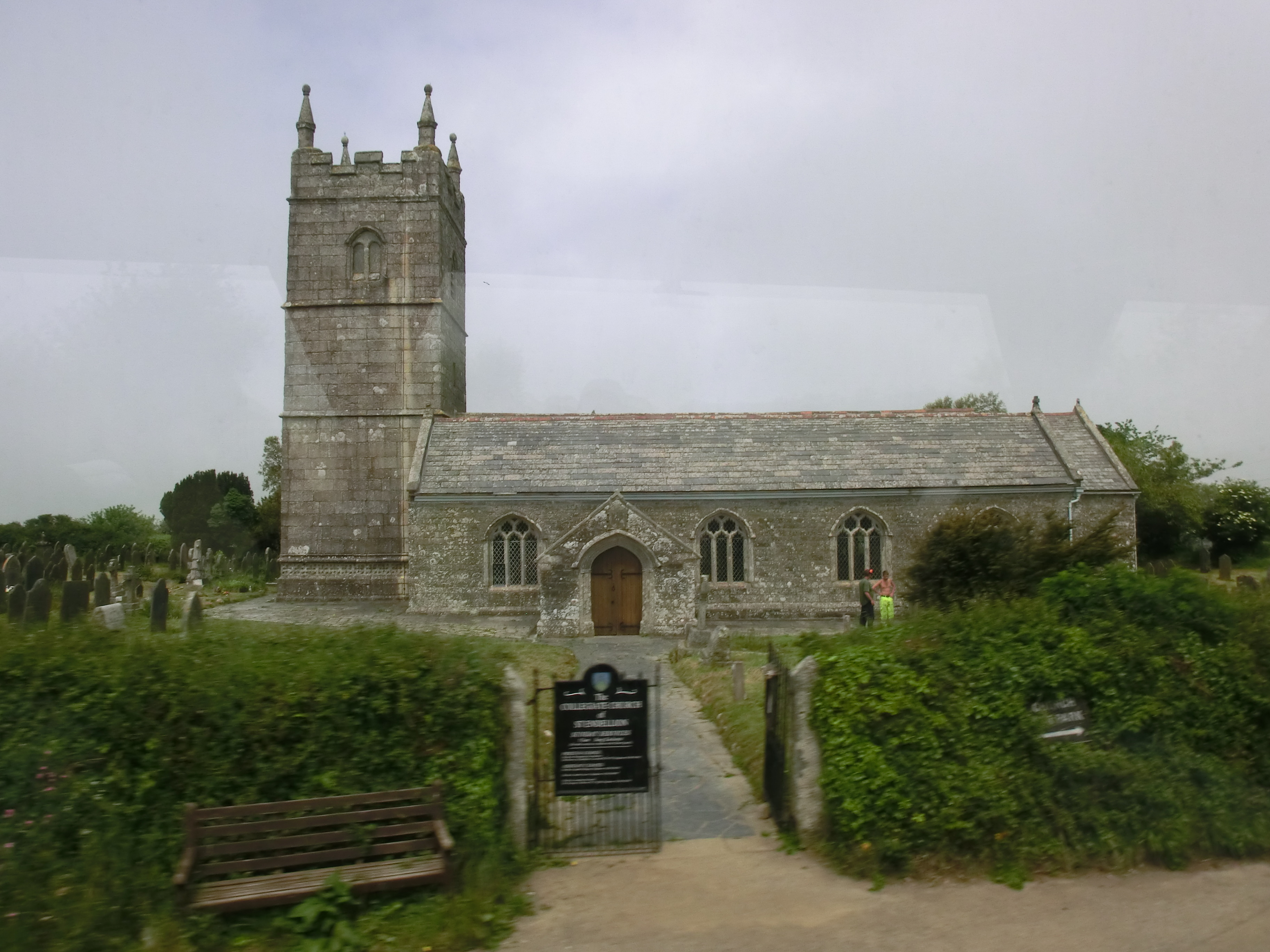
St Endellion church

The Collegiate Church of St Endellion stands beside the road to Wadebridge and is a large Perpendiculaty style building of the 15th century noted for its carved stone and woodwork.

The earliest record of the church is in 1260, and in 1288 it is recorded as a collegiate church with four prebends, one of which carried the cure of souls and later became associated with the rectory. The collegiate foundation survived the dissolution of colleges in 1545, when only the rector was resident, and it continues in modified form today. One prebend is held by the Rector, while the others are usually held by incumbents of nearby parishes, including the prebend of Marnay's (St Elen's), commonly attached to Lanhydrock.

A new ecclesiastical parish of Port Isaac was created from St Endellion in 1913, with one prebend forming the endowment of the new benefice. In 1929, Walter Frere, Bishop of Truro, revived the collegiate foundation under new statutes, making the rectoral prebend resident and stipendiary while remaining prebends became honorary but retained spiritual and chapter obligations. St Endellion remains one of only three medieval collegiate foundations in England to continue in active use outside academic institutions, the others being Westminster Abbey, and St George's Chapel, Windsor Castle. The church was designated as Grade I listed in 1969.

A former chapel at Roscarrock was already in ruins by 1814.

According to local tradition, St Endelienta asked that her body be placed on a sledge drawn by bullocks and buried where they stopped, the site now occupied by the church.

== Annual events ==
Music festivals are held at Easter and at the end of July: they have been held in the summer since 1959 and at Easter since 1974. Some of the musicians involved formed the Endellion Quartet.

== Notable people ==
- Robert Beheathland (pre 1587 - 1627), one of the founding figures of Jamestown, Virginia, helped establishment of the first successful English colony in North America.
- Luigi Pietro Fortunato Josa, one time archdeacon of Georgetown (British Guiana), served as rector here in 1917–22. Luigi came from an elite Vatican family and served for many years in British Guiana as 'Missionary to the Coolies', he spoke some South Asian and Chinese languages and published one of the first manuals on Hindi language study.
- Dr Rowan Williams (born 1950), former archbishop of Canterbury, was installed as a prebendary at St Endellion Church by the Bishop of Truro, the Right Reverend Tim Thornton, in 2014.
- Florence Cameron: on 25 August 2010 it was announced that the British Prime Minister, David Cameron and his wife Samantha had named their newborn daughter "Florence Rose Endellion" after the village, reflecting the fact she was born while the Cameron family were holidaying in Cornwall.

== See also ==
- Trelights
