= Doc Martin =

British television comedy-drama series (2004–2022)

- Genre: Comedy-drama; Medical drama
- Created by: Dominic Minghella
- Inspired by: Martin Scurr
- Starring: Martin Clunes; Caroline Catz; Ian McNeice; Joe Absolom; John Marquez; Selina Cadell; Jessica Ransom; Eileen Atkins; Stephanie Cole; Katherine Parkinson; Stewart Wright; Lucy Punch
- Theme music composer: Colin Towns
- Countries of origin: United Kingdom; Australia (series 5)
- Original language: English
- No. of series: 10
- No. of episodes: 79 (list of episodes)

Production
- Executive producer: Mark Crowdy
- Producer: Philippa Braithwaite
- Production locations: Port Isaac, Cornwall, England
- Running time: 50–92 minutes
- Production companies: Buffalo Pictures; Homerun Film Productions; Ingenious Broadcasting (series 4); Auburn Entertainment (series 5); Birimba Productions (series 6)

Original release
- Network: ITV
- Release: 2 September 2004 – 25 December 2022

Related
- Best Medicine (American remake)

Doc Martin is a British medical comedy-drama television series starring Martin Clunes as Doctor Martin Ellingham. It was created by Dominic Minghella developing the character of Dr Martin Bamford from the Nigel Cole comedy film Saving Grace (2000). Real-life physician Martin Scurr was the inspiration for Bamford.

Ten series aired between 2004 and 2022, with a television film airing on Christmas Day in 2006. The ninth series premiered on ITV in September 2019. The tenth (and final) series was broadcast from 7 September 2022 to 26 October 2022; the last installment was a Christmas special that aired on 25 December 2022. On 29 December 2022 a documentary titled “Farewell Doc Martin” was shown on ITV, featuring behind-the-scenes interviews with the cast and crew as they filmed the final series. It also looked back at highlights from the 18 years of the show.

== Plot ==
Dr Martin Ellingham (Martin Clunes), a brilliant and successful vascular surgeon at Imperial College London, develops haemophobia – a fear of blood – forcing him to stop practising surgery. He obtains a post as the sole general practitioner (GP) in the sleepy Cornish village of Portwenn, where he had spent childhood holidays with his Aunt Joan (Stephanie Cole), who owns a local farm. Upon arriving in Portwenn – where, to his frustration, the locals address him as "Doc Martin" – he finds the surgery in chaos and inherits an incompetent receptionist, Elaine Denham (Lucy Punch). In series 2–4, she is replaced by Pauline Lamb (Katherine Parkinson), a new receptionist, and later also a phlebotomist. In Series 5, Morwenna Newcross (Jessica Ransom) takes up the post.

The programme revolves around Ellingham's interactions with the local Cornish villagers. Despite his medical excellence, Ellingham is grouchy and abrupt, and lacks social skills. His direct, emotionless manner offends many villagers, made worse by his invariably unpleasant responses to their ignorant, often foolish, comments. They perceive him to be hot-tempered and lacking in a bedside manner. In contrast, he feels he is performing his duties professionally and by-the-book, not wasting time chatting. Ellingham is very deadpan and dresses formally in a business suit and tie, regardless of the weather or the occasion, and he never takes off his jacket, even when delivering babies. He has no hesitation in pointing out the risks of unhealthy behaviours (e.g. smoking), both in private and in public gatherings.

The villagers eventually discover his fear of blood and the frequent and debilitating bouts of nausea and vomiting it causes. Despite this handicap, Ellingham proves to be an expert diagnostician and responds effectively to various emergencies in his medical practice; thus, he gradually gains grudging respect from his neighbours.

Ellingham does not get on with his parents but has a warm relationship with his Aunt Joan, who provides emotional support. When she dies after a heart attack, her sister Ruth (Eileen Atkins), a retired psychiatrist, comes to Portwenn to take care of her affairs and eventually decides to use the village as a permanent retreat, offering Martin the support Joan had provided.

A major theme throughout the series is Ellingham's relationship with a primary school teacher (eventually school headmistress) Louisa Glasson (Caroline Catz). Due to his difficulty in expressing feelings and his insensitive nature, the relationship has many ups and downs, though they eventually have a baby and later marry.

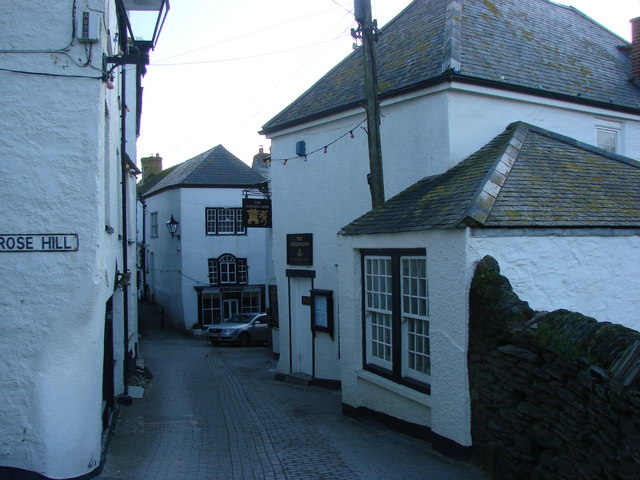
The Golden Lion doubled as Portwenn's local pub, The Crab & Lobster

Other series regulars are father and son duo Bert and Al Large, who are always trying to run a small business of some type; pharmacist Sally Tishell who is infatuated with Martin; and Mark Mylow, a quirky police officer who is replaced in Series 3 by the bumbling and inept Joe Penhale.

Regular cast members have characterised Ellingham's personality thus:

Joe Absolom: "The Doctor is ... slightly autistic, probably, on the spectrum."
Martin Clunes: "Lots of people say that he is Aspergic or something to some degree—which, yes, I think he is." He has also said, "He's wired the way he's wired, but growing up being loathed by both your parents is going to leave a footprint. That's why he's so dysfunctional with relationships, 'cause there's gaps in his makeup. A sad little boy in there comes out a lot, and that's what a lot of that frowning is."
Eileen Atkins: "He's unable to connect with people. He can't understand why people can't just take the truth, in a rather rough manner. If your parents have been very cold towards you and just factual, then that's very hard for you to grow up being—'loving' is too strong a word—an affectionate person."

== Cast and characters ==
=== Final main cast ===
- Martin Clunes as Martin Ellingham – village GP "Doc" Martin has no bedside manner. He despises small talk and is straightforward with patients, delivering his diagnoses and advice without trying to protect their feelings, though he is genuinely concerned about their health. Clunes also plays Martin's father in a flashback to Martin's childhood in one episode.
- Caroline Catz as Louisa Ellingham (née Glasson) – teacher at Portwenn Primary School, later becomes school headmistress, eventually Dr. Ellingham's wife.
- Ian McNeice as Bert Large – plumber and local entrepreneurial businessman who tries and fails at numerous get rich quick schemes.
- Joe Absolom as Al Large – Bert's son, who works in a variety of jobs during the series, including business partnerships with Ruth.
- Selina Cadell as Sally Tishell – a pharmacist, who overtly displays unrequited romantic feelings for Ellingham.
- John Marquez as Joe Penhale (series 3–10) – police officer Penhale greatly admires Ellingham, and believes they have a great working relationship, an optimistic assessment not shared by the doctor. Penhale has proudly referred to Ellingham and himself as "The Dynamic Duo". Ellingham focuses on Penhale's bumbling manner, but Penhale often shows surprising insight into the town's interpersonal dynamics.
- Eileen Atkins as Ruth Ellingham (series 5–10) – retired forensic psychiatrist, who is also one of Martin's aunts.
- Jessica Ransom as Morwenna Large (née Newcross) (series 5–10) – Al's girlfriend and later his wife, who becomes Dr. Ellingham's third surgery receptionist.

=== Previous main cast ===
- Stephanie Cole as Joan Norton – Martin's aunt (series 1–4)
- Stewart Wright as Mark Mylow – police constable, later promoted to sergeant (series 1–2, one episode in series 9)
- Lucy Punch as Elaine Denham – the original surgery receptionist (series 1)
- Katherine Parkinson as Pauline Lamb – practice manager & receptionist (series 2–4)

=== Other previous cast ===
| Actor | Character | Duration |
|---|---|---|
| Ben Miller | Stewart James (the local park ranger who has a giant squirrel friend named Anthony) | series 1, episode 4 "The Portwenn Effect" and series 2, episode 7 "Out of the Woods", Series 10 (episode 3) |
| Rupert Young | Adrian Pitts (a young, arrogant doctor) | series 1 |
| Kurtis O'Brien | Peter Cronk (schoolboy) | series 1–2 |
| Preston Nyman | Peter Cronk | series 7 |
| Mary Woodvine | Joy Cronk (Peter's mother) | series 1–2, 7 |
| Vicki Pepperdine | Mrs Richards | series 1–2 |
| Celia Imrie | Lady Susan Brading | series 1, episode 1 "Going Bodmin" |
| Richard Johnson | Col Gilbert Spencer | series 1, episode 1 "Going Bodmin" and "On the Edge" TV film |
| Finlay Robertson | Ross | series 1–2 |
| Vincent Franklin | Chris Parsons (member of Primary Care Trust) | series 1, 4–5, 8, 10 |
| Jeff Rawle | Roger Fenn (retired schoolteacher) | series 1–3 |
| Felicity Montagu | Caroline Bosman | series 1–2, 6–7 |
| Angeline Ball | Julie Mitchell (girlfriend/fiancée of PC Mark Mylow) | series 2 |
| Kenneth Cranham | Terry Glasson (Louisa's father) | "On the Edge" TV film and series 10, episode 5 |
| Chris O'Dowd | Jonathan Crozier | TV film |
| Jonathan Aris | Gavin Peters | TV film |
| John Woodvine | Christopher Ellingham (Martin's father) | series 2 |
| Claire Bloom | Margaret Ellingham (Martin's mother) | series 2, 6, 10 |
| Tristan Sturrock | Danny Steel (former boyfriend of Louisa) | series 2, 7 |
| Joseph Morgan | Mick Mabley | series 3 |
| Lia Williams | Dr. Edith Montgomery Martin's ex-girlfriend | series 4 |
| Malcolm Storry | Clive Tishell (Sally's husband) | series 4–5, 7–8 |
| Angela Curran | Caitlin Morgan (napkin lady and shop owner) | series 4, 8–10 |
| Louise Jameson | Eleanor Glasson (Louisa's mother) | series 5 |
| Julie Graham | Maggie Penhale (Joe's ex-wife) | series 5 |
| Buffy Davis | Pippa Woodley (school teacher) | series 5-9 |
| Annabelle Apsion | Jennifer Cardew (fill in pharmacist) | series 6 |
| Felix Scott | Michael Pruddy | series 6 |
| Rosie Ede | Mel Hendy | series 6, 8, & 9. (The actress also played the mother of a patient, Cameron Paris, in series 2 episode 2 "In loco".) |
| Caroline Quentin | Angela Sim (vet and daughter of Martin's predecessor, the late Dr. Jim Sim) | series 7-9 |
| Robyn Addison | Janice Bone (nanny) | series 7–10 (played for two episodes in series 6 by Katie Moore) |
| Emily Bevan | Dr. Rachel Timoney (psychiatrist) | series 7 |
| Sigourney Weaver | Beth Traywick (American tourist) | series 7, 8 |
| John Hollingworth | Professor Sam Bradman | series 8, 9 |
| Olivia Poulet | Julia Pote | series 9 |
| Fay Ripley | Abigail | series 10 |
| Angus Imrie | Max Foreman | series 10, episode 2 |
| James Puddephatt | Ron Pickford | series 10, episode 3 |

=== Original character ===
Martin Clunes originally played a character called Dr. Martin Bamford in the comedy film Saving Grace (2000)—written by Mark Crowdy and Craig Ferguson—and its two made-for-TV films, Doc Martin and Doc Martin and the Legend of the Cloutie, which were made by British Sky Broadcasting (BSkyB). The films show Bamford as a successful obstetrician, rather than a surgeon, who finds out that his wife has been carrying on extramarital affairs behind his back. After confronting her with his discovery, he escapes London and heads for Port Isaac, a small coastal town in Cornwall that he remembers fondly from his youth. Shortly after he arrives, he is involved in the mystery of the "Jellymaker" and, following the departure of the village's resident GP, decides to stay and fill the vacancy. In these three films the village is not known as Portwenn.

The Martin Bamford character is friendly and laid-back, seeming to enjoy his retreat from the career pressures and conflicts he left behind in London. He drinks and smokes carelessly, including a mild illegal drug, and has no problem getting his hands and clothes dirty by temporarily working as a lobster and crab fisherman aboard a local boat.

The original deal had been to produce two television films per year for three years, but Sky Pictures folded after the first two episodes were made, so Clunes's company tried to sell the concept to ITV. The new network felt that the doctor character should be portrayed as a "townie", a fish out of water who is uncomfortable in the countryside. They also wanted something darker, so Clunes suggested that the doctor be curmudgeonly, socially inept, and formal. The new doctor's surname was changed to Ellingham, an anagram of the last name of the new writer, Dominic Minghella, who was brought in to rework the doctor's background and create a new cast of supporting characters.

Apart from Clunes, the only actors to appear in both versions of Doc Martin are Tristan Sturrock and Tony Maudsley.

== Episodes ==
Ten series, totalling 79 episodes, aired on ITV in the UK between 2004 and 2022. Episodes are just under 50 minutes long, except for the 2006 TV film which is 92 minutes, and the 2022 Christmas special. In the US, American Public Television provided the 2006 TV film as a two-part episode, with the second episode airing a week after the first.

| Series | Episodes | Originally released | | Avg. viewers (millions) |
| Series | Episodes | First released | Last released | Avg. viewers (millions) |
|---|---|---|---|---|
| 1 | 6 | 2 September 2004 | 7 October 2004 | 9.32 |
| 2 | 8 | 10 November 2005 | 5 January 2006 | 8.68 |
| TV Film | | 25 December 2006 | | 5.88 |
| 3 | 7 | 24 September 2007 | 5 November 2007 | 9.12 |
| 4 | 8 | 20 September 2009 | 8 November 2009 | 9.15 |
| 5 | 8 | 12 September 2011 | 31 October 2011 | 10.60 |
| 6 | 8 | 2 September 2013 | 21 October 2013 | 8.97 |
| 7 | 8 | 7 September 2015 | 2 November 2015 | 7.61 |
| 8 | 8 | 20 September 2017 | 8 November 2017 | 7.41 |
| 9 | 8 | 25 September 2019 | 13 November 2019 | 7.10 |
| 10 | 9 | 7 September 2022 | 25 December 2022 | 5.42 |

In April 2020, director Nigel Cole confirmed plans for a tenth and final series, which aired in Autumn 2022.

== Locations ==
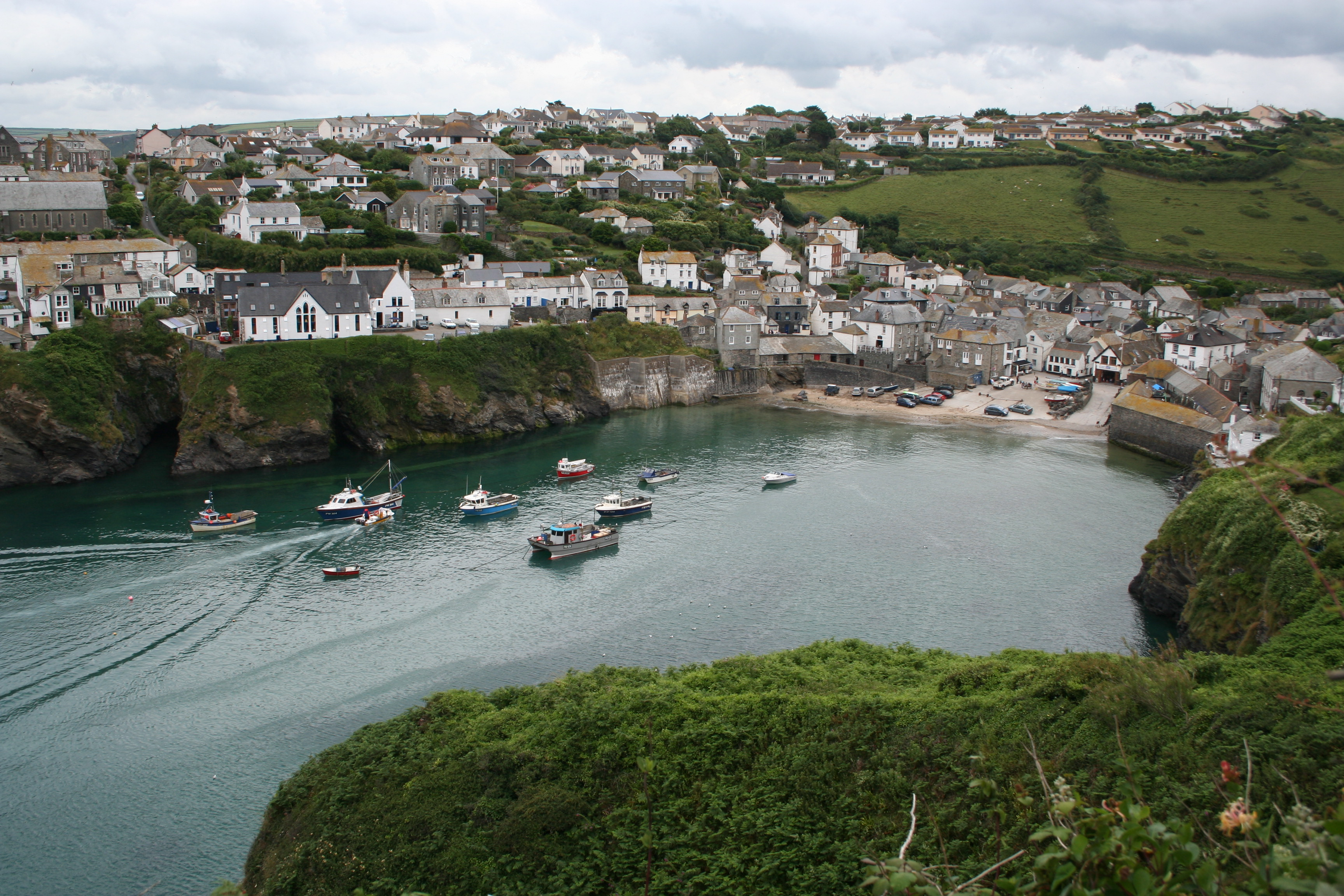
Doc Martin is filmed in the Cornish village of Port Isaac

The programme is set in the fictional seaside village of Portwenn and filmed on location in the village of Port Isaac, Cornwall, United Kingdom, with most interior scenes shot in a converted local barn. Fern Cottage is used as the home and surgery of Doctor Ellingham.

== Reception ==
=== Ratings ===
In the UK, Doc Martin was a ratings success for ITV, with the third series achieving ITV's best midweek drama performance in the 9pm Monday slot since December 2004. The final episode of the third series was watched by 10.37 million viewers, which is the programme's highest-ever viewing figure for a single episode.

In 2009, Doc Martin was moved to a 9pm Sunday time slot for the broadcast of Series 4. That change meant that it followed ITV's The X Factor programme. Series 4 ratings were adversely affected by STV not screening the majority of ITV drama productions in Scotland. The final episode of Series 4 had ratings of 10.29 million viewers. STV went back on its decision not to screen ITV dramas in Scotland. Series 4 of Doc Martin was broadcast on Sunday afternoons in August 2011.

=== Accolades ===
In 2004, Doc Martin won the British Comedy Award for "Best TV Comedy Drama", having also been nominated for "Best New TV Comedy". In the same year, Martin Clunes won the "Best TV Comedy Actor" award, primarily for his portrayal of Doc Martin.

== Adaptations ==
=== Czech Republic and Slovakia ===
In 2014, Czech Television and Radio and Television of Slovakia began filming their own TV series starring Miroslav Donutil, which is heavily inspired by the original British series. The series started to air on 30 August 2015 in Slovakia and from 4 September 2015 in Czechia. The Czech version is set in the Beskydy mountains, which is a picturesque area in the east of the Czech Republic on the border with Slovakia; like Portwenn, it is a long way from the capital, Prague, and dependent on the tourist industry.

=== France ===
In cooperation with TF1, French television company Ego Productions has produced a French version of the series starring Thierry Lhermitte as Dr Martin Le Foll, with the series based in the fictional Breton town of Port-Garrec and filmed in Finistère. The series was broadcast on TF1 from 10 January 2011 to 27 April 2015.

=== Germany ===
In Germany, Doktor Martin, an adaptation of the original series, airs on ZDF with Axel Milberg as Doktor Martin Helling, a surgeon from Berlin.

=== Greece ===
In Greece, Kliniki Periptosi, an adaptation of the original series filmed in the Ionian Seaside town of Kardamyli, was aired in November 2011 on Mega Channel with Yannis Bezos as Markos Staikos, a surgeon from New York.

=== Netherlands ===
In the Netherlands, Dokter Tinus based on the original series began airing in late August 2012 on SBS6, with the main role being played by actor Thom Hoffman. The series was shot in Woudrichem on the Waal riverside.

=== Spain ===
Notro Films produced a Spanish version under the title Doctor Mateo for Antena 3 Televisión. The lead role of Dr. Mateo Sancristobal was played by Gonzalo de Castro. It premiered in 2009 and was shot in Lastres, Asturias, called the fictional village of San Martín del Sella.

=== United States ===
In May 2025, Fox gave a series order to an American version under the title Best Medicine. The lead role of Doctor Martin Best is played by Josh Charles. Liz Tuccillo serves as a writer and executive producer the series alongside Ben Silverman and Rodney Ferrell of Propagate Content, as well as the original series' producers Mark Crowdy and Philippa Braithwaite. The series premiered on January 4, 2026. Clunes made a guest appearance in the series as Martin Best's father, Doctor Robert Best.

== Home media ==
Series 1, 2 and 3 and "On the Edge" were released separately in Region 1 and 2 and in the "complete Series 1 to 3" box set. Series 3 was released on 2 February 2010 and Series 4 was released in Region 1 and 2 on 6 July 2010. Series 5 was released in Region 1 on 5 June 2012 and Region 2 on 5 March 2012. A complete box set of Series 1-5 is also available in Region 2. Series 6 of Doc Martin was released in Region 1 in December 2013 and in the UK (Region 2) on 24 March 2014.

Series 7 of Doc Martin was released on DVD/Blu-ray in Region 1 on 8 December 2015 and in the UK (Region 2) on 16 November 2015.

In Region 4, Series 1, 2, 3, 4, and "On the Edge" were released separately and in a nine-disc box set entitled "Doc Martin: Comedy Cure", as well as an earlier seven-disc box set not including Series 4. The two Sky Pictures telefilms were individually released in Region 4 (as "Doc Martin: Volume 1" and "Doc Martin: Volume 2, the Legend of the Cloutie") on the Magna Pacific label.

In Region 1, Series 1 was released in June 2007 by Image Entertainment of Chatsworth, CA as a 2-DVD set (Catalogue No. ID3505PKDVD) simply titled Doc Martin.

Region 4 (Australia) Releases:

Australian Region 4
| DVD Title | Release Date | Re-Release |
| Complete Series One | 29 March 2006 | 2 October 2019 |
| Complete Series Two | 26 July 2006 | |
| On The Edge | 10 October 2007 | |
| Complete Series Three | 14 May 2008 | |
| Complete Series Four | 11 August 2020 | 7 March 2018 |
| Complete Series Five | 21 March 2012 | 7 November 2018 |
| Complete Series Six | 23 April 2014 | |
| Complete Series Seven | 27 April 2016 | |
| Complete Series Eight | 6 December 2017 | |
| Complete Series Nine | 1 April 2020 | |
Box Sets
| DVD Title | Release Date | Re-Release |
| Complete Series One and Two | 8 November 2006 | |
| Doc Martin Collection (Series 1-3 + On the Edge) | 5 November 2008 | |
| Doc Martin Comedy Cure (Series 1-4 + On the Edge) | 20 April 2011 | |
| Series One-Five Collection | 7 November 2012 | |
| Series One-Six Collection | 26 November 2014 | |
| Series One-Seven Collection | 3 May 2017 | |
| Complete (Series 1-8 + On the Edge) | 5 December 2018 | |
| Complete (Series 1-9 + On the Edge) | 28 October 2020 | |

== Airings beyond the UK ==
This series is popular around the world, both as itself and as a model for shows made in other nations.

As of 2018, Doc Martin was aired in New Zealand on TVNZ 1, in Iceland on RUV, in Italy on the Hallmark Channel from September 2007 (seasons 1-3), Rai 3 from May 2010 and various reruns. The series was streaming on RaiPlay, in Australia on Australian Broadcasting Corporation (ABC) network and Foxtel pay-television subscription network via its British-TV channel. The show aired and streamed on various public broadcasting stations around the US and Canada; this was arranged through the distributor American Public Television. As of 2021, it was streaming on Netflix, Pluto TV, Tubi and Amazon Prime Video.

== Novelisations ==
Two novels by Sam Hawksmoor, using the byline "Sam North", were published by Ebury in 2013. The first, Practice Makes Perfect, adapts the teleplays of series one; the second, Mistletoe and Whine, adapts the teleplays of series two. The author employs some timeline shifting, linked to character internalisation and point of view, so the narratives are not always as linear as in the teleplays.

== See also ==
- British sitcom

== Bibliography ==
- Avery, Alison (26 April 2019). "Where is Doc Martin filmed? A look at the real Portwenn – Port Isaac". Beautiful England Photos.
