= Cornwall film locations =

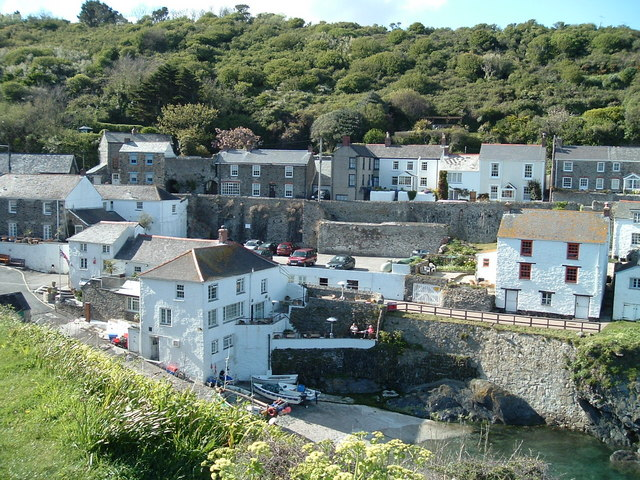
Portloe alias St Gweep

Cornwall's rugged landscape and scenery have been used by film and television companies as a backdrop for some of their productions.

The most recent critically and commercially successful film to be made mostly in Cornwall was the 2019 musical comedy, Fisherman's Friends and its 2022 sequel which in turn was inspired by the true story of the folk band of the same name and was shot in and around Port Isaac near Wadebridge. Cornwall's links with film and television go back to the 1930s when Jamaica Inn was shot at Bolventor but the oldest recorded films made in Cornwall date back to 1899 when a short, silent, black and white documentary film, Wreck of the S.S. Paris was filmed at the Manacle Rocks near the Lizard, and in 1904 black and white, silent film, sponsored by the Great Western Railway as a promotional film for holidays in Cornwall, called Scenes in the Cornish Riviera was filmed at the Royal Albert Bridge at Saltash, Looe, Polperro, Newquay, Truro, Falmouth, Penzance, St Michael's Mount, Lands End and St Ives.

In 1971, Sam Peckinpah's infamous movie Straw Dogs, starring Susan George, was filmed at St Buryan and Lamorna. More recent films featuring Cornwall include Saving Grace, set on the north coast around Port Isaac, Boscastle and Trebarwith Strand, and Johnny English, part of which was filmed at St Michael's Mount.

Cornwall's scenery came to particular prominence in the mid-1970s with the serialisation of Poldark, based on the novels of Winston Graham. More recent success has come with Doc Martin, Wycliffe, Wild West, Penmarric (1979 BBC TV series), Frenchman's Creek (1998 TV adaptation) and The Camomile Lawn (1992). In June 2007 it was announced that ex-Neighbours star Jason Donovan is to appear with former EastEnders actress Martine McCutcheon in ITV1's upcoming soap opera about surfing in Cornwall. The former soap stars play ex-lovers in Echo Beach, a post-watershed drama set in fictional coastal resort Polnarren. The show will run in tandem with Moving Wallpaper, a sitcom starring Ben Miller as a producer desperate to make Echo Beach a success.

The use of Cornwall as a film location has led to the establishment of ventures based in the area, including the £6 million South West Film Studios at St Agnes, now owned by Marilyn Gough, the Cornwall Film Fund, the Cornwall Film Festival, and the production company Mundic Nation.

== List of film locations in Cornwall ==
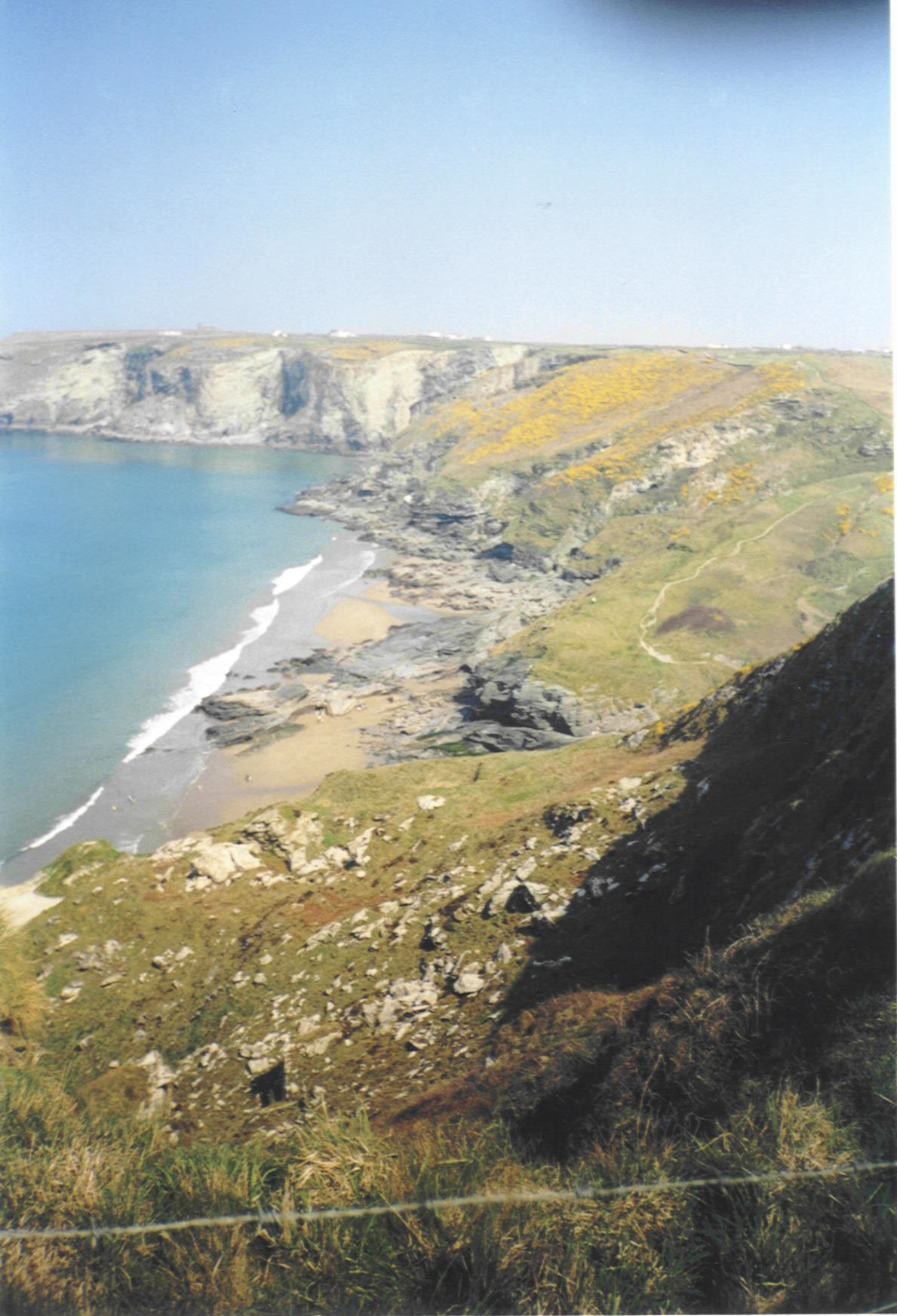
Trebarwith Strand, looking East towards Tintagel

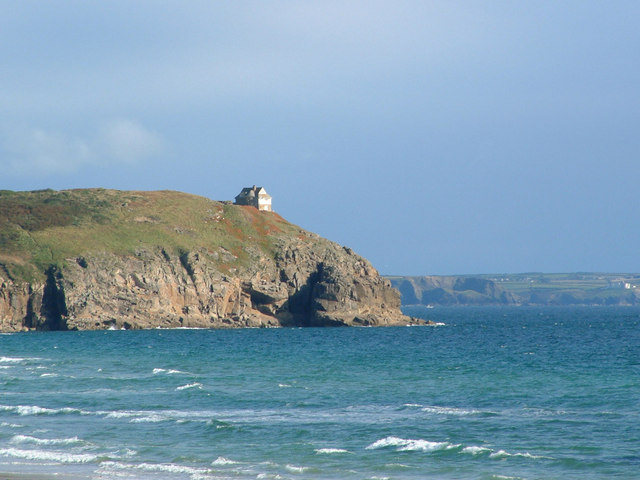
Rinsey Head

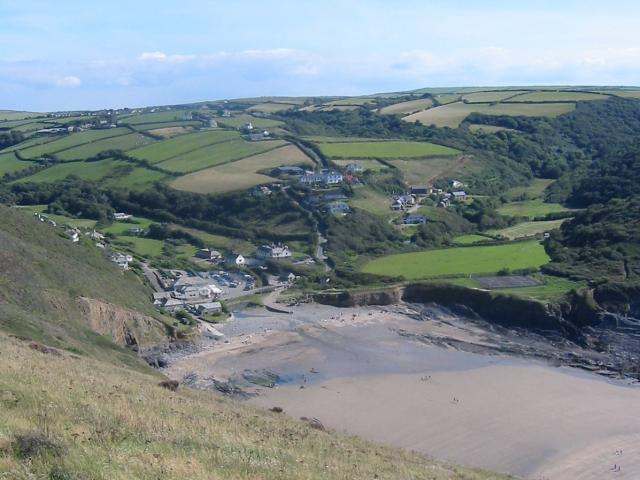
Crackington Haven

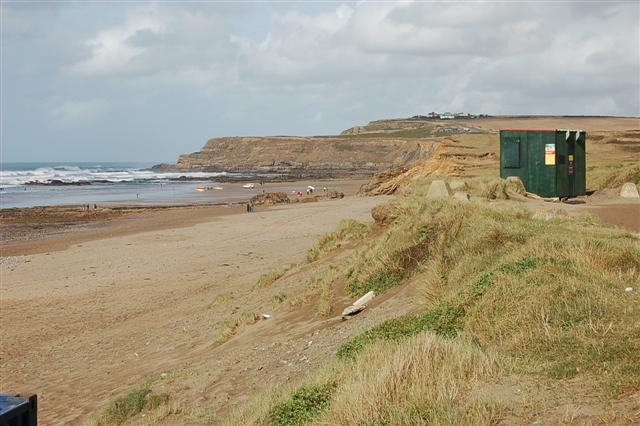
Widemouth Bay

- The Presence of Love (2021) - Truro, Bodmin, Helston, Penzance, Porthleven, Newquay
- Make Up (2019) - St Ives Bay Holiday Park, Upton Towans, Hayle
- Bait (2019) - Charlestown and West Penwith
- Welcome to Curiosity (2018) - Truro, Feock, Trelissick Manor, River Fal, Cardinham, Goonhilly Earth Station
- Hinterland (2015) - Polzeath and Port Isaac
- About Time (2013) - St Austell
- Cold and Dark (2005) - South West Film Studios at St Agnes
- Ladies in Lavender (2004) - Penzance and Helston areas.
- San Antonio (2003) - Widemouth Bay
- Johnny English (2003) - St Michael's Mount.
- Die Another Day (2002) - Holywell Bay, Eden Project.
- Saving Grace (2002) - Port Isaac, Boscastle, Trebarwith Strand
- The Magical Legend of the Leprechauns (1999) - Watergate Bay, Bodmin Moor
- Mansfield Park (1999) - Charlestown
- The Shell Seekers (1998) - Land's End, Lamorna, Marazion
- Swept from the Sea (1997) - Crackington Haven, Bodmin.
- Oscar and Lucinda (1997) - Boscastle, Port Isaac, Bossiney
- Rebecca (1997) - Charlestown
- Poldark (1996) - Rinsey (The Lizard), Lansallos (near Looe), Penrose Estate (Helston)
- Moll Flanders (1996) - Falmouth, Charlestown
- Twelfth Night (1996) Trebarwith Strand
- Blue Juice (1995) - Newquay, St Ives, Mousehole, St Agnes, Godrevy
- The Three Musketeers (1993 film) - Boconnoc
- The Witches - Headland Hotel, Newquay
- When the Whales Came (1989) - Bryher, Isles of Scilly
- Doomwatch (1988) - Mevagissey, Polperro
- Never Say Never Again (1983) - Carn Brea, St Michael's Mount brief overflight.
- Dracula (1979) - Carlyon Bay
- The Eagle Has Landed (1976) - Newquay and Charlestown
- Malachi's Cove or The Seaweed Children (1974) - Trebarwith Strand
- Straw Dogs (1971) - St Buryan, Lamorna
- Magical Mystery Tour (The Beatles) (1967) - Newquay
- Night of the Eagle (1962) - Cape Cornwall, Porthcurno Beach
- Knights of the Round Table (1953) - Tintagel
- Treasure Island (1950) - Carrick Roads, River Fal, Helford River, Falmouth
- Johnny Frenchman (1945) - Mevagissey
- Miranda (1948) - Carlyon Bay, Polperro, Looe.
- Love Story (1944) - Minack Theatre
- Jamaica Inn (1939) - exteriors shot at Bolventor
- The Mystery of the Mary Celeste (1935) - Falmouth
- The Uninvited (1944) - "They call them the haunted shores, these stretches of Devonshire and Cornwall and Ireland which rear up against the westward ocean."

== Television filmed in Cornwall ==
- Beyond Paradise (2023) - Looe
- Poldark (2015-2019) - various locations
- Echo Beach (2008) - Newquay
- Doc Martin (2004-2022) - Port Isaac
- A Seaside Parish (2003) - Boscastle
- Hornblower (2002) - Falmouth, Charlestown, Pendennis Castle, St Mawes, Rame Head
- Wild West (2002) - Portloe
- Coming Home (1998) - Lelant, Prideaux Place (Padstow), Marazion
- Frenchman's Creek (1998) - various locations
- Wycliffe (1993-1998) - various locations
- The Camomile Lawn (1992) - Veryan and Portloe
- A Dorothy L. Sayers Mystery: Have His Carcase (1987) - Holywell Bay Beach
- Sherlock Holmes: The Devil's Foot (1988) - Kynance Cove, Mount's Bay, Lanyon Quoit, West Penwith
- Penmarric (1979) - various locations
- Poldark (1975-1977) - various locations
- The Onedin Line (1971-1980) - Charlestown

== See also ==
- List of topics related to Cornwall
- Cornwall Film Festival
