= Rose of Nevada =

British time travel drama film

- Theatrical release poster
- Directed by: Mark Jenkin
- Screenplay by: Mark Jenkin
- Story by: Mark Jenkin; Mary Woodvine
- Produced by: Denzil Monk
- Starring: George MacKay; Callum Turner
- Cinematography: Mark Jenkin
- Edited by: Mark Jenkin
- Music by: Mark Jenkin
- Production companies: Bosena; Film4; British Film Institute; Head Gear Films
- Distributed by: BFI Distribution
- Release dates: 30 August 2025 (Venice); 24 April 2026 (United Kingdom)
- Running time: 114 minutes
- Country: United Kingdom
- Language: English
- Box office: $1.4 million

Rose of Nevada is a 2025 British time travel supernatural horror-drama film written, edited, composed and directed by Mark Jenkin. Starring George MacKay and Callum Turner, the film tells the story of a fishing vessel that was lost at sea 30 years ago, and mysteriously reappears in the harbour of a fishing village. Rosalind Eleazar, Francis Magee, Mary Woodvine, Edward Rowe, and Adrian Rawlins appear in supporting roles.

The film had its world premiere in the Orizzonti section of the 82nd Venice International Film Festival on 30 August 2025. It was theatrically released in the United Kingdom by BFI Distribution on 24 April 2026, and was met with favorable reviews from film critics, who praised its unique narrative, surreal atmosphere, and visual elements.

== Plot ==
A Cornish fishing village is in a state of economic decline. Three decades earlier, when the village was thriving, the fishing vessel Rose of Nevada and its crew were lost at sea. The loss of the crew still pervades the village and the community has never recovered. One day, Rose of Nevada reappears in the harbour, shocking former businessman Mike, who once owned it. He decides to crew the boat.

Nick, a husband and father, is struggling to make ends meet and joins the crew to pay for a collapsed roof. Liam, an itinerant worker who sleeps rough at the docks, is also recruited by Mike. Nick and Liam are to be led by grizzled rent-a-skipper Murgey, an experienced sailor. Before Nick sets out, he is confronted by his senile neighbour Mrs. Richards. She and her husband are still grieving the loss of their son Luke, one of the original fishermen on Rose of Nevada, who committed suicide as a result of guilt over the loss of the boat. Mrs. Richards cryptically states that the boat was, indeed, completely lost, and hints that Luke's death was the cause. Confusing Nick for Luke, she warns him not to let the boat's crew dwindle.

Together, the men set out in search of fish and return home with a robust catch. But when the boat returns, something is amiss. They are back where they started, but 30 years earlier. Stranger still, the men have been mistaken for locals: Liam for Alan, an absentee father who disappeared with the Rose of Nevada; and Nick for Luke.

Realizing he is displaced in time, Nick runs to his now empty home, to find the Richards now welcoming him as their son. He becomes distant from them and fixated on getting back to his original time. Liam settles into the role of Alan, romancing his wife Tina and becoming a father to Jess, whom he had previously flirted with in the present. He fully settles into the community, joining Mike and the other townspeople to weave a new net for the boat after the old one is lost during a storm. Nick, on the other hand, attempts again and again to reset time by returning to sea, or fleeing the village, or trying to communicate with his wife Emily, to no avail. He is beset by disturbing visions, and eventually realizes Rose of Nevada is the sole provider for the town's economy. Nick's attempt to confront Liam over the wrongness of the situation leads to a fistfight.

Nick takes to sleeping in his future house and is plagued by nightmares of the original crewmates and of Mrs. Richards. After an attempt to communicate with Emily and his daughter fails, he flees to the same cliff where Luke committed suicide. On realizing the boat will be lost if he jumps, he returns to the Richards' home and settles into being their son. Returning to Rose of Nevada for another day's work, he has a hallucinatory vision of Emily and his daughter saying goodbye at the dock. Emily whispers in a distorted voice that "there is no time," before Mike abruptly helps Nick back onto the boat.

== Cast ==
- George MacKay as Nick
- Callum Turner as Liam
- Rosalind Eleazar as Tina
- Francis Magee as Murgey
- Mary Woodvine as Mrs. Richards
- Edward Rowe as Mike
- Adrian Rawlins as Mr. Richards
- Yana Penrose as Jess / Lindsey
- Emily Daglish-Laine as Morvah
- Mae Voogd as Emily

== Production ==
The film was produced by Bosena and financed by Film4 Productions and the British Film Institute. The BFI contributed £1.3 million of funding for the film, the largest single production award since the BFI Filmmaking Fund was relaunched in 2023.

Rose of Nevada is the third installment of Jenkin's Cornish trilogy. The first, Bait (2019), was a kitchen sink drama about the corrosive effect of tourism on coastal towns; the second, Enys Men (2022), concerned a lone wildlife volunteer worker who is plagued by visions while living on a remote island. Elements of both show up in this third film.

=== Filming ===
Principal photography took place on location in Cornwall, with the assistance of a group of students from Falmouth University. Jenkin also served as cinematographer, and shot it in 16mm film in the 1.35:1 aspect ratio, in his own '76 Bolex H-16 SB camera.

George MacKay described it as "a joy to be part of".

== Release ==
The film premiered at the 82nd Venice International Film Festival, and had its North American premiere in the Special Presentations program at the 2025 Toronto International Film Festival on 6 September 2025. It had its U.S. premiere in the main slate of the 63rd New York Film Festival, at the Lincoln Centre, and was also screened at the 69th BFI London Film Festival.

It was released in the United Kingdom and Ireland on 24 April 2026, by BFI Distribution.

== Reception ==
=== Box office ===
Rose of Nevada earned $379,591 domestically and $1,004,796 in international markets, with a worldwide gross of $1,383,656.

=== Critical response ===
On the review aggregator website Rotten Tomatoes, 92% of 104 critics' reviews are positive, with an average rating of 7.8/10. The website's consensus reads: "Weaving a hypnotic tapestry of bold analogue imagery, spellbinding storytelling, and mesmeric sound, Rose of Nevada reinforces Mark Jenkins as a uniquely singular directorial voice." Metacritic, which uses a weighted average, assigned the film a score of 84 out of 100, based on 29 critics, indicating "universal acclaim".

Neil Alcock of Empire awarded the film a three out of four star-rating, writing: "The time-travel premise sounds high-concept, but this is less Robert Zemeckis than Robert Bresson. You might be reminded of Back to the Future by the bamboozled protagonist looking for a way to escape a 30-years-younger version of his home town, but Jenkin is more interested in a nightmarish, woozy ambience, evoked by rhythmic sound and images and fractured editing, than a propulsive, clearly determined narrative." The Guardian's Peter Bradshaw similarly praised the film and its surreal atmosphere, noting: "In the hands of a conventional film-maker, this would be a conventional scary movie, like one of Roald Dahl’s Tales of the Unexpected, crossing all the “t”s and dotting all the “i”s of scariness. Jenkin makes of it something more elusive and complex, with a strangeness and enigma present from the beginning; the film appears to be saying that there is something unknowable here even without the time slip."

Tim Grierson of the Los Angeles Times praised the film, writing that its story "slowly pulls you inside its disquieting design. By the time you get your bearings, you’re ensnared in its net". Brandon Yu of The New York Times wrote of the film: "Using scuzzy, tactile cinematography and creaky audio, Jenkin is interested in breaking and reconstructing familiar filmic grammar—here, a utensil simply being handed over manages to create tension just waiting to burst. That vintage quality becomes a threshold into the hypnotically mournful, wherein dreamscapes dance on the edge of nightmare, and ghost stories suddenly feel like desperate attempts to retrieve what was lost."
