= Helen Rule =

British actress

Helen Rule is a British actress based in Cornwall, England.

== Career ==
In 2002 she landed her first film role, after completing a 2-year BTEC National Diploma acting course at Cornwall College, in a Cornish language feature film Hwerow Hweg. The film went on to be nominated for best feature at the Celtic Media Festival and was released in Wales, Canada and Brittany. Rule was then cast in several short films including a domestic violence awareness film which led to a role in the award-winning thriller The Lark starring Mary Woodvine and Phil Jacobs and her first major film role in horror Siren Song starring C Thomas Howell. Theatre credits include West-Side Story and Coriolanus with appearances as a student in Nutcracker Suite and Cinderella (with the European ballet). Audio book credits include the Amy X series by screen writer and author Danny King and The RED Trilogy by Paul Kane.

=== Television ===
Year	Title	Role	Notes
1995	"Wycliffe"		Episode: "Happy Families"
2002	Wild West (TV series)		Episode: "Tin Tin Tin"
2013	Living The Part	Olivia	Episode: "The Duke"

=== Film ===
Year	Title	Role	Notes
1999	"Frenchman's Creek (TV movie)		
2002	Hwerow Hweg	Becky	
2007	The 12 Inch Pianist (short film)	Villager	short film
2007	New Boots	Police Officer	short film
2007	The Lark (2007 film)	Siobhan	
2012	A Mother's Love	Sarah	short film
2014	After Melanie	Jenny	short film by Amanda Whittington-Walsh
2016	Blood Lust	Tess	aka Siren Song [UK] & #cannibal island [Germany]
