= Michael J. Shannon =

American actor (1943–2023)

Michael J. Shannon (January 24, 1943 – November 23, 2023), also billed as simply Michael Shannon, was an American actor and playwright.

== Life and career ==
Shannon was best known for appearances in films such as Little Shop of Horrors, Red Dwarf, Future Cop and We'll Meet Again, the last two being his most substantial television roles, as Officer John Haven and Major James Kiley, respectively.

Shannon was born in Chicago on January 24, 1943. He graduated with a Bachelor of Science in Theatre Arts from Northwestern University (whose School of Communication grants Bachelor of Science degrees in all of its programs of study, including theater). He subsequently received a Master of Arts in Oral Interpretation from Northwestern.

In addition to his filmography, he maintained substantial theatrical acting credits throughout his career, including the British premiere of Arthur Kopit's The End of the World with Symposium to Follow in Southampton (Nuffield Theatre) and the London premiere of A. R. Gurney's The Dining Room (Greenwich Theatre, 1983, directed by Alan Strachan). In 2013 he gave four benefit performances in aid of Amnesty International of the monumental one-man play Clarence Darrow by David V. Rintels, based on the life of the lawyer and founding member of the American Civil Liberties Union, at the Teahouse Theatre in Vauxhall, London.

The first play he authored, Deros On the Funny Farm, was first produced at the Long Wharf Theater in New Haven in 1981 with Kevin Bacon in the lead.

=== Theme of the American President ===
A recurring feature of his career, in acting and writing, is the figure of the American president. He portrayed John F. Kennedy in the BBC television series Red Dwarf, starred in two episodes of the ABC television series Call to Glory titled 'JFK' (parts 1 and 2, though not as the president) and has written and starred in a one-man play, JFK on JFK. Hoyt Hilsman, in reviewing the play for Back Stage West, wrote, "Shannon's memorable performance captures the soul of the late president like none other in recent memory."

Shannon took the role of Harding in James Staley's play about the scandal-plagued American president Warren G. Harding, Everyone's Friend, which premiered in August 1999 at Whitefire Theatre. Los Angeles Times critic Philip Brandes wrote that "Shannon makes a heartbreakingly believable case for Harding's ignorance of and outrage at the abuses of his Cabinet."

Shannon portrayed Abraham Lincoln in a play he also authored, Watching with Lincoln, produced at the Royal Academy of Dramatic Art in 2014.

His play Liberty Rising is set in the Revolutionary War featuring George Washington and John Adams alongside their wives Martha and Abigail.

=== Personal life ===
Shannon was the second husband of the late British-born actress Vickery Turner. He and Turner met during the American season of Frith Banbury's production of the play The Day After The Fair by Frank Harvey, which opened on September 4, 1973 at the Auditorium Theatre in Denver, Colorado and closed January 20, 1974 at the John F. Kennedy Center for the Performing Arts in Washington, D.C. Shannon played the role of Bradford and Turner the role of Anna. Their daughter Caitlin is also an actress and writer.

Shannon died on November 23, 2023, at the age of 80.

== Filmography ==
=== Films ===
Film
Year	Title	Role	Notes
1974	Shoot It Black, Shoot It Blue	Purcell	
1975	That Lucky Touch	Lt. Davis	Credited as Michael J. Shannon
1980	Never Never Land	Peter	
1980	Superman II	President's Aide	Credited as Michael J. Shannon
1982	Making Love	Marty	
1984	Sheena	Phillip Ames	
1985	Death of an Angel	Bishop Holmes	
1986	Little Shop of Horrors	Television Reporter	Credited as Michael J. Shannon
1995	Paparazzo	Denis Prince	
1995	Balto	Mr. Johannson	(voice) uncredited
1997	Event Horizon	The Admiral	Scenes deleted
2001	Beginner's Luck	Old luvvie	
2005	American Gun	Jerry	Credited as Michael J. Shannon
2010	Invincible Scripture	Robert	
2012	The Strange Case of Wilhelm Reich	Judge Clifford	
2012	Dark Shadows	Board Member 2	Credited as Michael J. Shannon
2012	The Raven	Dr. Morgan	
2013	Möbius	Le père d'Alice	Credited as Michael J. Shannon

=== TV ===
Television
Year	Title	Role	Notes
1972	All My Children	Dr. Bill Hoffman	(TV series), 1 episode,
1975	The Hanged Man	Milton Webber, credited as Michael J. Shannon	(TV mini-series), 1 episode: "Grail and Platter",
1976	Arthur Hailey's the Moneychangers	Lew Endicott	(American TV mini-series), 4 episodes
1976	Rock Follies	Carl 'Tubes' Benson	(TV mini-series), 5 episodes
1976	Nouvelles d'Henry James	James Sinclair, credited as Michael J. Shannon	(TV series), 1 episode: "L'auteur de Beltraffio"
1976–1977	Future Cop	Officer Haven	(American TV series), 7 episodes
1977	The Feather and Father Gang	Richard	(American TV series), 1 episode: "Here a Spy, There a Spy"
1978	Lillie	Freddie Gebhard, credited as Michael J. Shannon	(TV series), 2 episodes: "America" and "Home on the Range"
1978	Target	Bradley	(TV series), 1 episode: "Rogue's Gallery"
1978	Cops and Robin	John Haven	(American TV Pilot, follow-up of Future Cop)
1978–1979	Wonder Woman	Lt. Stonehouse (1978) / Cameron (1979)	(American TV series), 3 episodes
1979	The Best Place to Be	Patrick Callahan	(American TV movie)
1979	Charlie's Angels	Tim Stone	(American TV series), 1 episode: "Rosemary, for Remembrance"
1979	Lou Grant	Mac McIvor	(American TV series), 1 episode: "Gambling"
1981	Riker	Brice Landis	(American TV series), 5 episodes
1981	Eight Is Enough	Ben Catron	(American TV series), 1 episode: "If the Glass Slipper Fits"
1982	We'll Meet Again	Major James Kiley / Maj. Jim Kiley	(TV series), 13 episodes
1983	Shades of Darkness	Edward Boyne, credited as Michael J. Shannon	(TV series), 1 episode: "Afterward"
1983	The Paper Chase	Morrison	(TV series), 1 episode: "Spreading It Thin"
1983	Philip Marlowe, Private Eye	Dr. Sutro, credited as Michael J. Shannon	(TV series), 1 episode: "Smart Aleck Kill"
1983	Perfect Shadows	Chuck Miller, credited as Michael J. Shannon	(American TV movie)
1984	Partners in Crime	Hamilton Frye	(American TV series), 1 episode: "The Set-Up"
1985	Behind Enemy Lines	Robert Harwell	(American TV movie)
1985	Call to Glory	Malcolm Sloane	(American TV series), 2 episodes: "JFK: Part 1" and "JFK: Part 2"
1985	Simon & Simon	Dr. Claude Dreyer	(American TV series), 1 episode: "Out-of-Town Brown"
1985	Remington Steele	Frank Bigelow	(American TV series), 1 episode: "Now You Steele It, Now You Don't"
1986	The A-Team	Randy Anderson	(American TV series), 1 episode: "The Grey Team"
1986	The Ted Kennedy Jr. Story	Senator John Tunney	(American TV movie)
1986	Dempsey and Makepeace	Conrad, credited as Michael J. Shannon	(TV series), 2 episodes: "The Burning" and "The Burning:Part 2"
1986	Scarecrow and Mrs. King	Dr. Scardelli	(American TV series), 1 episode: "The Eyes Have It"
1987	Poor Little Rich Girl: The Barbara Hutton Story	Morley Kennerly, credited as Michael J. Shannon	(American TV movie)
1987	The Ladies		(TV movie)
1987	The Two Mrs. Grenvilles	Jack Fisher, credited as Michael J. Shannon	(American TV mini-series), 1 episode: "Episode #1.1" and "Episode #1.2"
1988	Out of the Shadows	Frank Osbourne	(American TV movie)
1988	A Very Peculiar Practice	Vice-Chancellor Jack Daniels	(TV series), 7 episodes
1989	Pride and Extreme Prejudice	Chapinski, credited as Michael J. Shannon	(TV movie)
1989	Boon	Peter Shelley, credited as Michael J. Shannon	(TV series), 1 episode: "Sickness and Health"
1989	Anything More Would Be Greedy	Toby Dehring	(TV mini-series), 6 episodes
1989	Tailspin: Behind the Korean Airliner Tragedy	Grover	(TV movie)
1989	Murder by Moonlight	Ivanov	(TV movie)
1990	Poirot	Mr Baker Wood, credited as Michael J. Shannon	(TV series), 1 episode: "Double Sin"
1991	Merlin of the Crystal Cave	Blackbeard	(TV series), 2 episodes: "The Return" and "Reckoning"
1991	Josie		(TV series), 1 episode: "Episode #1.6"
1992	The Big Battalions	David	(TV mini-series), 4 episodes
1993	Prime Suspect 3 (TV mini-series)	Jake Hunter, credited as Michael J. Shannon	(TV series), 1 episode: "Part 1"
1993	Maigret	Oswald Clark, credited as Michael J. Shannon	(French TV series), 1 episode: "Maigret and the Hotel Majestic"
1994	Fatherland	US Ambassador, credited as Michael J. Shannon	(American TV movie)
1994	Scarlett	Maxwell	(TV mini-series), 1 episode: "Episode #1.1"
1994	Royce	Senator Scanlon, credited as Michael J. Shannon	(TV movie)
1994	Under the Hammer	Charles B. Whiteside, credited as Michael J. Shannon	(TV series), 1 episode: "After Titian"
1995	Goodnight Sweetheart	Ed Murrow, credited as Michael J. Shannon	(TV series), 1 episode: "Between the Devil and the Deep Blue Sea"
1995	Screen Two	Neil Turkle	(TV series), 1 episode: "Nervous Energy"
1995	The Affair	Capt. Ford	(TV movie)
1995	Detonator II: Night Watch	Martin Schraeder, credited as Michael J. Shannon	(TV movie)
1995	The Boss (TV series)	Milton Macrae, credited as Michael J. Shannon	(TV series), 1 episode: "Pilot"
1995	Space Precinct	Dr. Henry Jansen, credited as Michael J. Shannon	(TV series), 1 episode: "Flash"
1996	In Suspicious Circumstances	Philip Yale Drew, credited as Michael J. Shannon	(TV series), 1 episode: "The Monster of Reading"
1997	13th Rider	Robert	(TV series), 1 episode
1997	Screen One (TV series)	Admiral, credited as Michael J. Shannon	(TV series), 1 episode: "Hostile Waters"
1997	Red Dwarf	John F. Kennedy, credited as Michael J. Shannon	(TV series), 1 episode: "Tikka to Ride"
1998	30 Years to Life	Graham, credited as Michael J. Shannon	(TV movie)
1998	Only Love	Dr. Duncan, credited as Michael J. Shannon	(American TV movie)
1999	CI5: The New Professionals	Stryker, credited as Michael J. Shannon	(TV series), 1 episode: "Phoenix"
1999-2001	JAG	Major General Richard Plesac	(American TV series), 2 episodes: "War Stories" and "Baby, It's Cold Outside"
2004	Crossing Jordan	Philip Corday, credited as Michael J. Shannon	(American TV series), 1 episode: "Dead in the Water"
2007	Brothers & Sisters	Tom Burgess, credited as Michael J. Shannon	(American TV series), 1 episode: "Domestic Issues"
2007	You've Got a Friend	Brayton Jennings	(American TV movie)
2007	The Riches	Ashley Tutt, credited as Michael J. Shannon	(American TV series), 1 episode: "Believe the Lie"
2008	Boston Legal	Avery Wilson	(American TV series), 1 episode: "The Gods Must Be Crazy"
2014	Endeavour	Nahum Gardiner, credited as Michael J. Shannon	(TV series), 1 episode: "Nocturne"
