= Hwerow Hweg =

2002 film

Hwerow Hweg is a 2002 drama film written and directed by Hungarian film-maker Antal Kovacs and filmed in the Cornish language.

== Plot ==
Jack (Robert Williams) is released from prison after being framed in a drugs-related set-up by his girlfriend Becky (Helen Rule). Armed with a gun, he goes in search of his lover with dire consequences. At one point, Jack drops into Caractacus's café bar, and Leonard is reading to his muse, Miss McGee, and to his Afghan friend and musician, Dizzy. This scene was cut from the Film festival because of licensing issues, but is in the Director's Cut.

== Cast ==
- Robert Williams - Jack
- Helen Rule - Becky
- Laurens Postma - Paul
- Phillip Jacobs - Magnus
- Soozie Tinn - Iris
- Johanna Graham - Sarah
- Laurens C. Postma - Paul
- Giles King - Frank, the tattoo man
- Dominic Knutton - Jimmy Fisher
- Bec Applebee - Becky Roberts (Wrong Becky)
- Tim Beattie - Sergeant Pascoe
- Lucy Fontaine - Jack's Mother
- Mike Sagar Fenton - Jack's Stepfather
- Pol Hodge - Undercover cop 1
- Jenny Martin - Iris's Assistant
- David Shaw - Old Man
- Leonard Cohen ... Himself
- Daniel Moorehead ... Dizzy
- Attila Sheeran ... The Afghan
- Stephanie Lynn Nicks ... Tits McGee
- Ian Smith ... Smithy - The Turk with the Bubble Pipe
- Paul Cottrell ... Fester
- Dave Potts ... Caractacus
- Freddie Dunstan ... The Artist
- Barry Mellor ... Wishy Washy
- Neville Shaw ... The Engineer
- Des ... Des the Waiter

== Release and reception ==
With a budget of €250,000 and two unknown actors in the leading roles, it received an indifferent reception at the Cornwall Film Festival (Gool Fylm Kernow) although its official premiere at the House of Commons was greeted much more positively. In 2003, it was nominated for Best Feature Length Film at the 2002 Celtic Film and Television Festival.

== Trivia ==
The Cornish premiere was 12 April 2003 at Pennseythun Gernewek, during a language weekend held at Pentewan Sands holiday park. The film was also made in English although this version has never been released or shown. Its English title is Bitter Sweet.

It is the first feature-length film made in Cornish, a Celtic language that is undergoing a revival in Cornwall.

Filmed partly on location at Gooninnis House in St Agnes with local photographer Colinge Bradbury & his muse Nicky Pope.
