= The Lark (2007 film) =

- Directed by: Paul Farmer; Mark Jenkin; Steve Tanner
- Written by: Paul Farmer
- Produced by: Paul Farmer
- Starring: Mary Woodvine; Mark Pearce; Helen Rule; Phil Jacobs
- Release date: November 2007 (Cornwall Film Festival)
- Running time: 70 minutes
- Country: United Kingdom
- Language: English

The Lark is a 2007 British psychological thriller film directed by Paul Farmer, Mark Jenkin and Steve Tanner and written by Paul Farmer. The film starred British TV actress Mary Woodvine, and was filmed in 18 days in Cornwall, England on a budget of £12,000. It premiered in The UK at the Cambridge Film Festival and has also been shown at the Cornwall Film Festival, The Calgary International Film Festival, The Twin Rivers Media Festival where picked up the 1st Place prize for Best Feature and at the 1st LIC Astoria Film Festival.

== Plot ==
The film opens with a woman, Niamh (Mary Woodvine), dragging a body in from the cold, white outside into what looks like a derelict factory with walls covered in strange, cryptic maps. She is wearing a blue boiler suit and a respirator. The body "Sean" (Ian Marshall) is also dressed in a blue boiler suit and appears badly wounded by a trap Niamh has set. Niamh calls out for "Doc" and "Friday" although nobody appears. Sean and Niamh seem to know each other. Two children appear asking what has happened. Niamh tells them that Sean has been outside without his respirator and is very ill. She tells the children to go back to their room and wait for her. Sean quips that he is fine and asks if they want some sweeties. The children disappear. Sean repeats that he is 'fine' over and over again then tells her he can smell bread. Niamh agrees. She continues to drag him through endless corridors. Later, Niamh is frantically cleaning the trail of blood on the floor. Rory and Roisin, the children, appear and ask if they can help look for respirators. Later they are in their room where Niamh tells them that Sean has left them some sweeties. After reading them a bedtime story she sings them to sleep.

Niamh starts talking to her friend Doc (Phil Jacobs), they talk about Sean and she asks him to re-set the traps. She doesn't acknowledge that he is not dressed in a boiler suit and he seems matter-of-fact about the situation, but Niamh is tense. As she goes to search for more respirators she starts imagining strange images and noises. We see an old style film recording of Niamh in normal clothes having a picnic. It abruptly cuts back to Niamh presently. A while later she hears a noise coming from the main door. Doc notes that he thought Niamh had set the traps. As Niamh turns to respond Doc has vanished. She goes to investigate. Two people are now inside the building also wearing boiler suits and carrying torches. Niamh follows them and eventually corners them in a small room demanding to know how they have been walking outside without respirators and what they are doing here. The man "Jackson" (Mark Pearce) and the woman "Siobhan" (Helen Rule) claim they are looking for Sean. Niamh stops interrogating them and asks them to follow her. They seem bewildered at Niamh's obsession with the strangely marked maps on the wall and eventually they end up in another room where Niamh informs Jackson that he will be sleeping there. He doesn't seem keen on being split up from Siobhan and Niamh asks her if they sleep together. Siobhan laughs at this and says the fact Jackson will be in the small room on his own serves as 'poetic justice'. Niamh seems puzzled at this comment but does not ask any questions. Siobhan remarks to Jackson that Niamh knows her name. She then leads Siobhan on another journey to her room where Siobhan tenderly asks Niamh how she can sleep in a place like this. Niamh rejects Siobhan's kindness and leaves her alone in the room. Later on Niamh catches Jackson and Siobhan looking for respirators, Siobhan shows Niamh some sweets she had found claiming they know they belong to Sean. Niamh takes to some of her maps and asks them to make all the maps 'right'. She tells them they either do it or go.

Niamh continues to have strange visions and dreams and when Doc appears he tells them it could be handy having Jackson and Siobhan there as they hold the 'secrets' she needs for her survival. She goes to see Jackson and Siobhan in Jackson's room armed with alcohol and food and claims it's time for a celebration. Jackson gets mad but Siobhan tries to calm him down. They end up getting drunk. Siobhan recognises a song that Niamh sings (A variant of A Brisk Young Sailor Courted Me) and tells Niamh that her father taught it to her, Niamh claims she can't remember where she heard it. Siobhan goes back to her room and leaves the remaining two on their own. Niamh asks Jackson why the tense atmosphere and after a confrontation Niamh storm out. She goes to her sleeping children and carries them away as she is now getting concerned about Siobhan and Jackson's presence. She begs Doc for help and they carry the children to the main door. Doc hands Rory back to Niamh who crumples to the floor, she cries out to Doc who simply appears to vanish. Niamh is left sobbing with her children unable to escape her 'prison'.

Angry, she goes to see Jackson desperately begging for the secrets. She asks if he's married, he replies he once was and shows her pictures of his children but she refuses to look at them and runs off. They soon begin to realise that Siobhan is missing and when they find blood in her room Niamh accuses Jackson of murdering her. He denies it and shows Niamh papers he says are the secrets that Niamh has been searching for. Niamh runs away from him and he pursues her. She realises her children are no longer there either. She tries to run from Jackson leading him around the maze of corridors and rooms. Her voice echos around the building as Jackson pursues her in desperation as he catches up with her he falls to his death through a hole in the floor Niamh had stumbled across before when she was looking for respirators.

Niamh examines Jackson's papers. They shock her into flashbacks: we discover that Niamh was suffering depression and killed her children and tried to kill herself. Jackson was her husband, Siobhan was her sister and Sean her father. All other characters are figments of her imagination. The police break into the building, the abandoned mental hospital in which Niamh was once a patient. Niamh is led outside, into the light.

== Cast ==
- Mary Woodvine - Niamh
- Mark Pearce - Jackson
- Phil Jacobs - Doc
- Helen Rule - Siobhan
- Iain Marshall - Sean
- Tim Wing - Friday
- Kitty Jacobs - Roison
- Theo Jacobs - Rory
