= The Midnight Drives =

- Directed by: Mark Jenkin
- Written by: Mark Jenkin
- Produced by: Simon Harvey
- Starring: Colin Holt; Alex Reid; Mary Woodvine; John Woodvine
- Cinematography: Steve Tanner
- Edited by: Mark Jenkin
- Music by: Alcatraz Swim Team
- Release date: 2007
- Country: United Kingdom
- Language: English
- Budget: £50,000

The Midnight Drives is a 2007 British comedy-drama film written and directed by Mark Jenkin, which revolves around a divorcee who takes his bored children on a series of mystical, dream-like excursions through the Cornish countryside after initially failing to connect with them.

== Cast ==
- Colin Holt as Andy Stafford
- Alex Reid as Sophie
- Mary Woodvine as Cafe Owner
- John Woodvine as Guesthouse owner
- Sam Mills as Casey Stafford
- Megan Robertson as Gabrielle Stafford

== Production ==
The film was made by independent film company O-Region and had Pippa Best on board as producer. It was filmed at various locations around Cornwall including Land's End, Marazion and Penzance.

== Release ==
The Midnight Drives premiered in the United Kingdom at the Cornwall Film Festival in October 2007 to a packed house and was subsequently selected for the London Film Focus and Ecran Britanniques festivals as well as the Celtic Media.

== Critical reception ==
Derek Malcolm, film critic for The Evening Standard commented on it as "A moving film about parentage with an exceptional performance from Colin Holt at its centre".
