= Pat Kelman =

British film distributor, photographer, director, writer and actor

Kelman, Pat
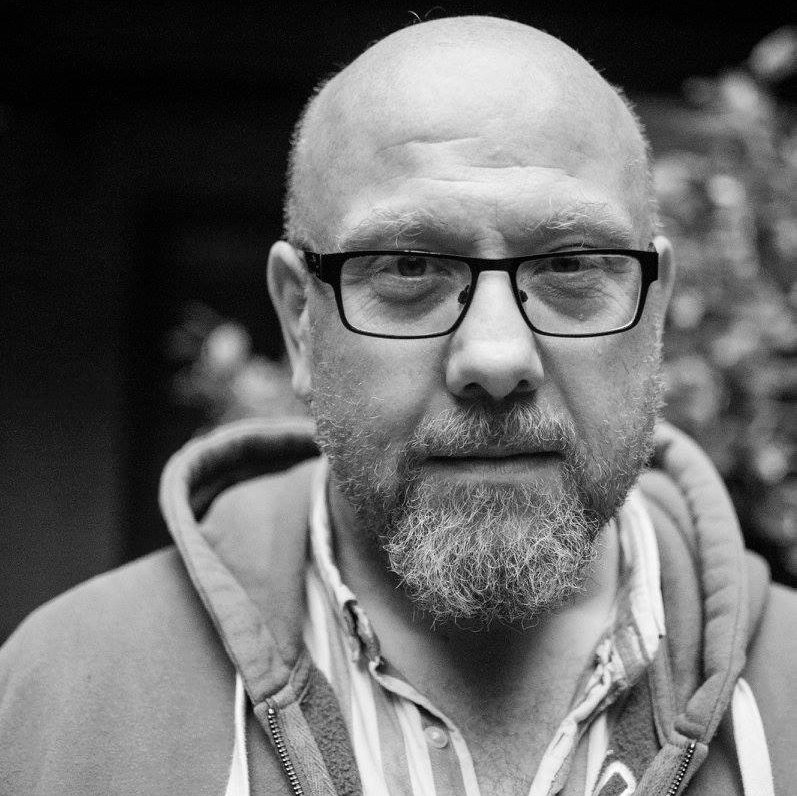
- Pat Kelman, October 2018
- Born: Kelly, Patrick
- Occupations: Film Distributor, Photographer, Actor, Writer and Director
- Known for: Actor in The Odyssey, Writer and Director of "Encounters".

Pat Kelman (b. Patrick Kelly) is a British film distributor, photographer, director, writer and actor. Born in Chelmsford, Essex, he was raised in Cornwall where he now lives after spending 20 years in London. He was trained at the University of London.

== Film Distribution ==
In 2018 he set up a new UK film distribution company, 606 Distribution in association with film colleague David Maddison. The company has recently acquired the films Polina and Hannah for release in the UK.

== Photography ==
In 2013 he established a photography business, utilising the visual and people skills he had gained through his directing and acting work to specialise in wedding and portrait photography.

== Acting career ==
As an actor, he made his screen debut in Andrei Konchalovsky's 1997 television miniseries of The Odyssey, playing the role of Elatus. He has also been seen in the 1999 horror film Lighthouse, The Jump, The Bill, and was a regular artist in the long-running BBC sitcom My Hero.

== Writing and directing ==
Encounters, his first film as writer and director which was produced by longtime collaborator Jonty Reason from Pittot Films, won Best Feature Film at the 2005 ReelHeART International Film Festival in Toronto and the 2005 Cheap Shot L.A. International Film Festival. The film also won the Delabole Slate Audience Award for Film of the Festival at the 2005 Cornwall Film Festival. Encounters was released on DVD by Celebrity Video Distribution in November 2009 under the international title Encounters: Speed Dating can Hurt

In 2007 he was funded by Cornwall Film, South West Screen and the UK Film Council to write and direct the short drama Pianissimo.

His most recent short film Francis was shown in March 2009 at the Angry Film Festival in Melbourne, Australia.

Francis was joint winner of the ReelTube category with Pat Kelman's other shorts The Letter Game and Elephant Boy at the 2009 ReelHeART International Film Festival.
