= Enys Men =

2022 film by Mark Jenkin

- UK theatrical release poster in Cornish, thought to be the first use of the language in a poster for a distributed feature film
- Directed by: Mark Jenkin
- Written by: Mark Jenkin
- Produced by: Denzil Monk
- Starring: Mary Woodvine; Edward Rowe; Flo Crowe; John Woodvine
- Cinematography: Mark Jenkin
- Edited by: Mark Jenkin
- Music by: Mark Jenkin
- Production companies: Film4; Sound/Image Cinema Lab; Bosena
- Distributed by: British Film Institute
- Release dates: 20 May 2022 (Cannes); 13 January 2023 (United Kingdom)
- Running time: 91 minutes
- Country: United Kingdom
- Language: English
- Box office: $582,353

Enys Men (Cornish for 'Stone Island') is a 2022 British experimental psychological folk horror film shot, composed, written and directed by Mark Jenkin, and starring Mary Woodvine, Edward Rowe, Flo Crowe and John Woodvine in his final film role. Set in 1973, the film follows a lone wildlife volunteer who begins experiencing nightmarish scenarios while residing on an island off the Cornish coast.

Inspired by local Cornish landmarks such as The Merry Maidens stone circle, Jenkin filmed Enys Men on location in West Penwith in the spring of 2021. The film was shot on 16 mm film during the COVID-19 lockdown, and the crew prioritised creating a small carbon footprint during production.

Enys Men premiered in the Directors' Fortnight section of the 2022 Cannes Film Festival. The film was released theatrically in the United Kingdom of 13 January 2023 by the British Film Institute, while Neon distributed the film in a limited release in North America on 31 March 2023. The film grossed $582,353 at the international box office, and received largely favorable reviews from film critics.

== Plot ==
In 1973 on an uninhabited island off the Cornish coast, a wildlife volunteer's daily observations of a rare flower turn into a metaphysical journey that forces her as well as the viewer to question what is real and what is nightmare.

The only feature that suggests a continuous flow of time (though highly sped up) is the appearance of a fruticose lichen growing on the flowers over three days and simultaneously on the protagonist's body. She has a nebulous relationship with a sinister standing stone, a teenage girl who may be her daughter or younger self, a mysterious preacher who may be her father, a group of older women, another group of young girls, a collection of ghostly miners who haunt the island's tunnels, and her sole human contact, a fisherman with whom she may have once been in love.

== Cast ==
- Mary Woodvine as The Volunteer
- Edward Rowe as The Boatman
- Flo Crowe as The Girl
- John Woodvine as The Preacher
- Joe Gray as The Miner
- Loveday Twomlow as The Baby
- Callum Mitchell as Sound Engineer

== Production ==
=== Development ===
Jenkin was heavily inspired by the Cornwall landscape when developing the film. Commenting on his inspiration, he said: "As a typical Cornish person, I hold superstitions and have always been intrigued and haunted by standing stones, their history and mythologies. And I thought that was a good marriage of form and content for a genre film that I could make under the radar in and around Cornwall." Jenkin's childhood visits to The Merry Maidens stone circle in Cornwall were of particular influence. "These images stayed with me and, years later, I found myself lying awake, wondering about those stones, what might they be up to, under cover of darkness, out there on their own, on the moor, with no one watching. This was the starting point for Enys Men."

=== Filming ===
The film was shot in West Penwith over the course of 21 days in March and April 2021 during the COVID-19 lockdown, which necessitated a smaller crew than was planned. The crew set out for production to have a low carbon footprint, producing only 4.55 tonnes of CO_{2} (compared with around 3000 tonnes for a typical film) which was offset. The film was shot on 16 mm Kodak film stock using a Bolex H-16 SB camera, with Jenkin operating the camera himself.

Jenkin chose to film the exterior daytime sequences using Kodak Vision3 50D Color Negative Film, and frequently under-exposed his film stock for stylistic purposes.

=== Post-production ===
Once completed, the exposed filmstock was processed at the Kodak Film Lab at Pinewood Studios before being scanned in 4K. The lab team were instructed to not perform any cleaning of the film, which would have removed dust or other particulates, and to refrain from performing any image stabilization.

Because the film was shot without a sound camera, all sound effects and dialogue were mixed via ADR in post-production using captured sound.

=== Musical score ===
Jenkin composed the musical score for the film using an analog monophonic synthesizer and tape loop. Gwenno Saunders composed an original ancient-sounding Celtic May song "Kan Me" which appears in the film's end credits.

== Release ==
Enys Men premiered in the Directors' Fortnight section of the 2022 Cannes Film Festival. In Bodmin, the film's opening night sold out within hours, and the film was a box office success for cinemas across Cornwall.

Neon acquired the film for North American distribution rights, giving it a limited theatrical release in the United States on 31 March 2023.

=== Promotion ===
The film was promoted bilingually, with posters being produced in both English and Cornish. It was thought to be the first instance of a distributed feature film having Cornish posters.

Neon premiered the film's theatrical trailer in the United States on 17 November 2022. In New York City, a giveaway drawing was held for a one-sheet poster of the film signed by writer-director Mark Jenkin.

=== Home media ===
Enys Men was released on dual format Blu-ray and DVD on 8 May 2023 via BFI distribution. In the United States, the film was released on DVD by Decal Releasing on 23 May 2023.

== Reception ==
=== Box office ===
In the United Kingdom, the film earned $74,781 during its opening weekend. Its final domestic gross was $189,579, with an additional $392,774 internationally, making for a worldwide gross of $582,353.

=== Critical response ===
On the review aggregator website Rotten Tomatoes, 80% of 94 critics' reviews are positive, with an average rating of 6.8/10. The website's consensus reads: "If its story's mysteries are ultimately less compelling than they might seem, Enys Men's retro aesthetic and intriguingly abstract visuals make this a chilly treat for horror fans." Metacritic, which uses a weighted average, assigned the film a score of 78 out of 100, based on 28 critics, indicating "generally favorable" reviews.

Mark Kermode, reviewing for The Guardian, gave the film five stars calling it "a richly authentic portrait of Cornwall" and saying Woodvine's performance was "quietly mesmerising". Adam Scovell, writing for BBC Culture, said that the film was "a perfect, anti-romantic expression of Cornish eeriness".

Caryn James of The Hollywood Reporter praised the film, noting that "it may take a second viewing to appreciate how intricately Jenkin has layered the film. The Volunteer reads by candlelight at night, always the same small book, A Blueprint for Survival (an actual book Jenkin found). Many of the visions from the past are juxtaposed with that reading, including a more-or-less 19th century pastor who gives a fiery sermon. A miner from the past reads the book while sitting on the toilet in the cottage, then calmly pulls up his pants and walks out the door... All this is absorbing even when it is unclear, as the aesthetic pull and rhythm of the film make up for any confusion. Anyone looking for answers or clarity will probably flee the film early, but it rewards multiple viewings for anyone willing to engage with it."

Jeannette Catsoulis of The New York Times wrote of the film: "Jenkin summons the ghosts of lost fishermen and long-gone female mine workers, known as bal maidens, stoking an atmosphere thick with ancient anguish. As a mossy growth spreads from the flowers to the woman’s body, the film’s editing grows more jagged, its rough and rocky landscape — captured on breathtakingly evocative 16-millimeter film — increasingly alien and unnerving. At times, Jenkin’s bold, experimental style can perplex; but his vision is so unwavering and beholden to local history that his message is clear: On Enys Men, the earth remembers what the sea has taken." The Los Angeles Times's Robert Abele likened the film to The Haunting (1963), noting that " Jenkin achieves the same effect here with his pastoral, oblique Cornish oddity, corralling his sublime, boxy compositions, sensorial editing and carefully hushed sound design into what can only be called a rusted, rustic nightmare."

David Fear of Rolling Stone suggested the film could be a "future cult classic" and compared it The Shining (1980), later ranking it as the fifth best horror film of the year. In an article for Far Out, Calum Russell wrote that Enys Men feels "like the spiritual continuation of Bait", Jenkin's previous film, and "more like an innovative art installation than a piece of narrative fiction".

The Washington Post's Michael O'Sullivan gave the film a middling review, praising it for its mood and atmosphere, but faulting it for its lack of narrative cohesion, summarizing it as "a good-looking, low-budget nightmare, shot on grainy, 16mm color film that makes Woodvine’s brilliant blue eyes contrast starkly with her ubiquitous red rain slicker. It’s a fever dream in which the past and present are confused, along with plant and animal, the living and the dead, and, ultimately, the meaning of this troubled vision."

=== Accolades ===
Award	Year	Category	Recipient(s)	Result	Ref.
Athens International Film Festival	2022	Best Picture	Enys Men	Nominated	
BFI London Film Festival	2022	Best Film	Enys Men	Nominated	
British Independent Film Awards	2023	Best Sound	Mark Jenkin	Won	
Cannes Film Festival	2022	Directors' Fortnight	Mark Jenkin	Nominated	
Dublin Film Critics' Circle Awards	2023	Best Cinematography	Mark Jenkin	3rd place	
The Guardian's Best Films	2023	The Best Film (June)	Enys Men	Won	
Fangoria Chainsaw Awards	2024	Best Limited Release Movie	Enys Men	Nominated	
Indiana Film Journalists Association	2023	Original Vision Award	Mark Jenkin	Nominated	
IndieLisboa International Independent Film Festival	2023	Best Feature Film	Enys Men	Nominated	
Sitges Film Festival	2022	Best Motion Picture	Enys Men	Nominated	
