= South West Film Studios =

Film studio in Cornwall, England

The South West Film Studios were built in 2002 at St Agnes in Cornwall, England, United Kingdom, and soon become known locally as "Aggiewood". Costing £5.7m to construct in total, the complex was one of the highest-profile Cornish projects backed by European Objective One funding, receiving nearly £2 million while the rest of the money came from the private sector. It was the first purpose-built film studio to be built in the UK since 1923 and was the region's first film studio complex. The studios were due to have state-of-the-art production facilities for the film and television industry and was constructed on a 10-acre (40,000 m^{2}) site which was a former leisure park and model village site in St Agnes. It had been expected that the studios would create 200 permanent jobs when they opened for business and pour millions of pounds into the local economy as it had the full backing of the South West Regional Assembly and the South West Regional Development Agency.

In October 2004 the studios went into administration when the former managing director, Alex Swann, a 44-year-old film producer from Notting Hill, London, was charged with 12 offences of forgery and deception totalling more than £1.8 million. In January 2005 officers from the Economic Crime Unit launched an investigation which resulted in the charges against Mr Swann who admitted four charges of forgery and seven of obtaining money by deception at Truro Crown Court in April 2007. He was also banned from being a company director for 13 years.

In the summer of 2006 the site was sold to St Agnes Properties, based in Tetbury, Gloucestershire, and the owners claim there are plans to re-open the studio under another name. However, since the building was mothballed it has been badly vandalised and squatters moved in during the summer of 2006. In October 2005 the studios hit the headlines when the Ford Anglia, used in the Harry Potter Films, went missing from the site. It was eventually found abandoned 10 miles (16 km) away on top of Carn Brea hill. No films were ever made at the studios despite claims that the studio had secured three movies to start imminent production.

== Controversy over Objective One funding ==
Professor Peter Gripaios, head of the South West Economy Centre at Plymouth Business School, criticised the decision to give Objective One funding to the film studios in the first place. It has been claimed by some local politicians that the South West Regional Development Agency discovered that private funding was not in place after they had signed the contracts but funds were subsequently made available to Alex Swann contrary to EU funding rules.

== See also ==
- Cornwall Film Festival
