= John Woodvine =

English actor (1929–2025)

- Born: 21 July 1929; Tyne Dock, South Shields, County Durham, England
- Died: 6 October 2025 (aged 96)
- Education: Royal Academy of Dramatic Art (RADA)
- Occupation: Actor
- Spouse: Hazel Wright (m. 1960–1985) Lynn Farleigh (m. 1996)
- Children: 2, including Mary Woodvine

John Woodvine (21 July 1929 – 6 October 2025) was an English actor who appeared in more than 70 theatre productions, as well as a similar number of television and film roles.

== Early life ==
John Woodvine was born in Tyne Dock, South Shields on 21 July 1929, the son of Rose (née Kelly) and John Woodvine, a ship's stoker who worked on cruise liners. He had two brothers. The family moved to London when he was five.

He was educated at Lord Williams's School, Thame, Oxfordshire, having been evacuated there during the Blitz. He worked for a while as a cement tester in a laboratory at King's Cross station and then undertook national service as a wireless operator with the RAF. He was a member of the Renegades amateur theatre company in Ilford. He worked for a wool merchant, and then trained for the stage at the Royal Academy of Dramatic Art (RADA), graduating in 1953.

== Career ==
Woodvine worked with the Old Vic company in the 1950s. In 1957, along with Russell Napier, John Carlisle and Edgar Lustgarten, Woodvine appeared in an instalment of the Scotland Yard film series ("The Silent Weapon", 1961). Woodvine also had a long involvement with the Royal Shakespeare Company, having appeared in 1976 opposite Ian McKellen and Judi Dench as Banquo in the Trevor Nunn production of Macbeth, which was later recorded for television. He also appeared in the RSC's 1980 landmark production of The Life and Adventures of Nicholas Nickleby, starring as the story's primary antagonist, Ralph Nickleby.

Woodvine frequently played police officers from early in his career, including a regular role in the British drama series Z-Cars as Det. Insp. Witty (1968–69) and guest appearances in Softly, Softly in the 1970s. He recreated his role of Inspector Kingdom in the 1970s police drama New Scotland Yard. He also appeared in a 1983 episode of Juliet Bravo and later as Sir Malachi Jellicoe in The New Statesman. In 1969, he appeared as the Manchester cleansing depot inspector, Mr Sinclair in first season of The Dustbinmen.

In 1971, Woodvine played Trincant in Ken Russell's film The Devils. Woodvine also played Macduff in the Play of the Month television broadcast of Macbeth on 20 September 1970, Union convenor Les Mallow in series 1 of When the Boat Comes In in 1975, the Marshal in the 1979 Doctor Who serial The Armageddon Factor and Chief Superintendent Ross in Edge of Darkness and appeared in several episodes of the 1985 television adaptation of The Tripods. He also played Prior Mordrin in the 1987 ITV series Knights of God. He played Frank Gallagher's father, Neville, in the Channel 4 drama Shameless, and PC Tony Stamp's father Norman in The Bill. In 2008, he appeared in the BBC2 comedy Never Better and as Joe Jacobs in the ITV1 soap Emmerdale. In 2010, he appeared as Alan Hoyle in Coronation Street and was replaced by Michael McStay in 2011 (who ironically passed away a few months prior to him). In December 1987 he played Dr James Shepherd in "The Murder of Roger Ackroyd", one of a series of Agatha Christie novels broadcast on radio by the BBC. In 2016, he played the role of the Archbishop of York in 4 episodes of the Netflix series The Crown.

His film roles include the 1981 John Landis film An American Werewolf in London (he later recreated his film role for the BBC Radio One adaptation of the film). He also appeared in the 1972 Richard Attenborough film Young Winston. Woodvine also appeared as Arthur Birling in the BBC World Service radio adaptation of An Inspector Calls and as Dr Byron Caligari in the BBC Radio 4 comedy series The Cabaret of Dr Caligari. He also voiced the role of "Prospero" on 6 May 2012 broadcast of The Tempest on BBC Radio 3.

=== Theatre ===
Woodvine made apprentice appearances with James Cooper's Renegades Theatre Company in Ilford, where he played such parts as the Conjur Man in Dark of the Moon and Claudius in Hamlet (a role he repeated with Prospect Theatre Company). In 1954 he played Caspar Darde in Captain Carvallo on a tour of service establishments.

He joined the Old Vic company in September 1954, walking on in Macbeth. Later in the same season he played Vincentio in The Taming of the Shrew (November 1954); Duke (Senior) in As You Like It (March 1955); Vernon in Part 1 and Lord Chief Justice in Part 2 of Henry IV (April 1955); Flavius in Julius Caesar (September 1955); Rugby in The Merry Wives of Windsor (September 1955); Cleomenes in The Winter's Tale (November 1955); and the Bishop of Ely and Macmorris in Henry V (December 1955).

In 1956 his roles for the company included Roderigo in Othello (February); Calchas in Troilus and Cressida (April); Murderer in Macbeth (May); Tybalt in Romeo and Juliet (June); and Lord Scroop of Berkeley in Richard II (July). These four last-named productions toured, including a three-week season at the Winter Garden Theatre in New York in December 1956 and January 1957. Returning to the company in September 1959, he played Careless in The Double Dealer (William Congreve); Mowbray in Richard II; and Nym in The Merry Wives of Windsor.

== Personal life and death ==
Woodvine was first married in 1960 to Hazel Wright, also an actor; they had two daughters, one of whom is the actor Mary Woodvine. They divorced in 1985, and in 1996 he married another actor, Lynn Farleigh.

On 11 May 2012 Woodvine collapsed offstage with a heart attack during a performance of the musical Carousel at the Grand Theatre, Leeds, shortly after his appearance as the Starkeeper. He was admitted to hospital and made a full recovery, returning to the stage after five months.

Woodvine died at his home on 6 October 2025, at the age of 96.

== Theatrical roles ==
His roles included:

- Harry Y. Esterbrook in Inherit the Wind, St Martin's Theatre, March 1960
- General Lew Wallace in The Andersonville Trial, Mermaid, June 1961
- Vasquez in 'Tis Pity She's a Whore, Mermaid, August 1961
- Long John Silver in Treasure Island, Mermaid, December 1961
- Pentheus in The Bacchae, Mermaid, February 1964
- Title role in Macbeth, Mermaid, April 1964
- Simon Eyre in The Shoemaker's Holiday, Mermaid, July 1964
- Theseus in Oedipus at Colonus, Mermaid, May 1965
- Cutler Walpole in The Doctor's Dilemma, Comedy Theatre, June 1966
- Badger in Toad of Toad Hall, Comedy Theatre, December 1966
- Jackie in Close the Coalhouse Door (Alan Plater), Fortune Theatre, October 1968
- Warrant Office Ormsby in Poor Horace, Lyric Theatre, May 1970
- Joe Wilson in a solo performance Joe Lives!, Newcastle University and Greenwich Theatre, June 1971
- Claudius in Hamlet, Prospect Company tour, August 1971
- Francis Drake in Elizabeth R Episode 5: The Enterprise of England, BBC TV, 1971
- Joined the Actors' Company in 1973 playing Sir Wiful Witwoud in The Way of the World, (Edinburgh Festival); Orlovsky in The Wood Demon; Kent in King Lear: including performances in all three parts at the Brooklyn Academy, New York, January 1974 and Wimbledon Theatre, March–May 1974.
- Cardinal in 'Tis Pity She's a Whore, March 1974, and Pontagnac in Ruling the Roost (Feydeau farce), Wimbledon, April 1974
- Staller in Stallerhof (Franz Xaver Kroetz), Hampstead Theatre, February 1975
- Gerald in The Formation Dancers (Frank Marcus), Yvonne Arnaud Theatre, Guildford, May 1975
- Joined the RSC for the 1976 Stratford season, playing Duke of Cornwall in King Lear; Dogberry in Much Ado About Nothing; Polixenes in The Winter's Tale; and Banquo in Macbeth (the latter also at The Other Place, August 1976, and Donmar Warehouse, September 1977).
- Doctor Pinch in The Comedy of Errors, RSC Aldwych, June 1977
- Repeated the roles of Dogberry and Capulet at the RSC Aldwych, June–July 1977
- Subtle in The Alchemist. RSC The Other Place, May 1977; and RSC Aldwych, December 1977
- Fainall in The Way of the World, RSC Aldwych, January 1978
- Alexander in Every Good Boy Deserves Favour, RSC Mermaid, June 1978
- For the 1979 RSC Stratford season he played Sir John Falstaff in The Merry Wives of Windsor, Malvolio in Twelfth Night, and the title role in Julius Caesar; also playing Falstaff and Malvolio at the RSC Aldwych, 1980 season
- Ralph Nickleby in The Life and Adventures of Nicholas Nickleby (David Edgar), RSC Aldwych Theatre, June 1980 – June 1981; (re-staged at the Old Vic for television recording, July–August 1981)
- Charles Merrythought in The Knight of the Burning Pestle (Beaumont and Fletcher), in repertory RSC Aldwych, April–June 1981
- Ralph Nickleby in Nicholas Nickleby, Plymouth Theatre, NY, October 1981 – January 1982
- Mr Prince in Rocket to the Moon (Clifford Odets), Hampstead Theatre, August 1982 and Apollo Theatre, September–November 1982
- Sir John Falstaff in The Henrys (Henry IV parts 1 and 2, and Henry V), English Shakespeare Company, Old Vic, March–May 1987
- Gregor Hasek in Between East and West (Richard Nelson). Hampstead, December 1987 – January 1988
- Gens in Ghetto (Joshua Sobol), National Theatre, Olivier, April–November 1989
- Chris Christopherson in Anna Christie (Eugene O'Neill), Young Vic, June–July 1990
- Shylock in The Merchant of Venice, and the title role in Volpone, English Shakespeare Company, Lyric Hammersmith and Warwick Arts Centre, February–March 1991
- Duncan in Macbeth, and Prospero in The Tempest, English Shakespeare Company, Lyric Hammersmith, November–December 1992
- George H Jones in Machinal (Sophie Treadwell), National Theatre, Lyttelton, October 1993 – February 1994
- Monsewer in The Hostage (Brendan Behan), RSC Barbican, September–October 1994
- Frank Armstrong in Heartbeat October 1995
- Priuli in Venice Preserv'd (Thomas Otway), Almeida Theatre, October–December 1995
- Jacques in As You Like It, RSC Barbican, October 1996 – March 1997
- Sir Henry Clinton in The General from America (Richard Nelson), RSC The Pit, February–April 1997
- Aslaksen in An Enemy of the People (Ibsen), National Theatre Olivier, September 1997 – January 1998
- Jack Donovan in Give Me Your Answer, Do! (Brian Friel), Hampstead, March–May 1998
- Flavius in Timon of Athens, RSC Royal Shakespeare Theatre, Stratford, August 1999; and RSC Barbican, March–April 2000
- King Philip II of Spain in Don Carlos (Schiller), RSC The Pit, January–April 2000
- Edgar Johnson in Life After Life (Paul Jepson/Tony Parker), National Theatre Lyttelton Loft, May–June 2002
- The Player King in Hamlet, RSC Courtyard Theatre, Stratford, July 2008

== Partial filmography ==
- Further Up the Creek (1958) – Sailor (uncredited)
- Champion Road (1958) – Ben, the Barman (2 episodes)
- Scotland Yard (film series) (1961) – "The Silent Weapon" S1:E35 – John Powers
- Darling (1965) – Customs Officer (uncredited)
- Coronation Street (1965) Lorry Driver (2010) Alan Hoyle
- The Saint (1966) - The Queen's Ransom - Pilot
- Danger Man Episode: Judgement Day (1965) – Shimon
- The Walking Stick (1970) – Bertie Irons
- The Devils (1971) – Trincant
- Young Winston (1972) – Howard
- Assault on Agathon (1975) – Matt Fenrek
- The Quiz Kid (1979) – Dennis
- An American Werewolf in London (1981) – Dr J. S. Hirsch
- Spaghetti House (1982) – Alto Funzionario
- Squaring the Circle (1984) – Gierek
- ’’Coot Club’’ (1984) - Mr Tedder
- Knights of God (1987) – Prior Mordrin
- The New Statesman (1987) – Sir Malachi Jellicoe
- Danny, the Champion of the World (1989) – Tallon
- Countdown to War (1989) – Joachim von Ribbentrop
- Leon the Pig Farmer (1992) – Vitelli
- Emily Brontë's Wuthering Heights (1992) – Thomas Earnshaw
- The Trial (1993) – Herr Deimen
- Dragonworld (1994) – Lester MacIntyre
- Fatherland (1994) – Luther
- Persuasion (1995) – Admiral Croft
- Heartbeat (1995) Frank Armstrong
- Midsomer Murders (2001) – "Electric Vendetta" S4:E3 – Sir Harry Chatwyn
- Vanity Fair (2004) – Lord Bareacres
- Miss Potter (2006) – Sir Nigel
- The Midnight Drives (2007) – Guesthouse Owner
- Flick (2008) – Dr Nickel
- Burke & Hare (2010) – Lord Provost
- Joe Maddison's War (2010 TV film) – Father Connolly
- Midsomer Murders (2011) - "The Oblong Murders" S14:E3 - Commodore
- Vera (2014) "Protected" S4:E2 – Alan Kenworthy
- The Crown (2016 TV series) – the Archbishop of York
- Enys Men (2022) – The Preacher

== Narration ==
- Greatest Goals: the World Cup from Charlton to Maradona (1987)
- History of Tyne and Wear metro- The Way Ahead
- All Our Working Lives BBC (1984)

== Sources ==
- Ian Herbert, Christine Baxter and Robert E. Finlay, ed. (1981). Who's Who in the Theatre (17th ed.). Detroit: Gale. ISBN 978-0-8103-0234-1.
- The Nicholas Nickleby Story: The making of the RSC production by Leon Rubin, Heinemann, London (1981) ISBN 0-434-65531-7
- Theatre Record and its annual Indexes
