= We'll Meet Again (TV series) =

British television series

- Genre: Drama
- Written by: David Butler; John Gorrie; David Crane
- Directed by: Tony Wharmby; Christopher Hodson; Peter Creegan; John Reardon
- Starring: Susannah York; Michael J Shannon; Lou Hirsch
- Theme music composer: Denis King
- Country of origin: United Kingdom
- Original language: English
- No. of series: 1
- No. of episodes: 13

Production
- Producer: Tony Wharmby
- Production company: London Weekend Television

Original release
- Network: ITV
- Release: 12 February – 14 May 1982

We'll Meet Again is a British television drama set in the Second World War. It was produced by London Weekend Television (LWT) for the ITV network and was broadcast in early 1982 in the Friday primetime slot of 9 pm.

== Plot ==
The show, based in a fictional village in East Anglia, was set around the clandestine and illicit love affair between civilian doctor Helen Dereham (played by Susannah York) whose husband was away fighting in Africa and the commanding officer of the nearby USAAF base, Major Jim Kiley (Michael J. Shannon).

== Cast ==
- Susannah York as Helen Dereham
- Michael J Shannon as Major Jim Kiley
- Lou Hirsch as Sergeant Hymie Stutz
- Patrick O'Connell as Jack Blair
- Lynne Pearson as Rosie Blair
- Carolyn Pickles as Sally Bilton
- James Saxon as Sergeant Elmer Jones
- Gavan O'Herlihy as Captain 'Red' Berwash
- June Barry as Vera Mundy
- Ray Smith as Albert Mundy
- Ronald Hines as Ronald Dereham
- Ed Devereaux as Colonel Rufus Krasnowici
- Christopher Malcolm as MSgt. Joe 'Mac' McGraw
- Natalie Ogle as Letty Mundy
- Patrick Pearson as Peter Mundy
- Kathryn Pogson as Vi Blair
- Lise Ann McLaughlin as Patricia Dereham
- Joris Stuyck as MSgt. Chuck Ericson
- Holly Watson as Betty Bilton
- David Baxt as Sgt. Mario Bottone
- Stuart Wilson as Sid Davis

== Production ==
Although a major commission for LWT, the programme was planned for just one series of thirteen hour-long episodes. Production commenced in 1981 with studio scenes filmed at the South Bank Television Centre and location filming in the villages of Lenham and West Malling in the county of Kent. As was standard practice at the time, studio scenes were recorded on 2-inch quadruplex videotape with location scenes shot on 16 mm film and converted to broadcast master tape via telecine. The show was transmitted between February and May 1982. LWT had previously produced Enemy at the Door, a series about the German occupation of Guernsey during the same war, and the two series have a common theme of tension between the locals and the 'intruding' soldiers whose presence affects their ways of life, something which can become obvious when actors play similar roles in similar storylines in both series (most obviously: Ray Smith, as the father of a girl who disapproves of his daughter associating with foreign servicemen).

The show's title was based on the popular wartime song "We'll Meet Again" performed by Dame Vera Lynn. The theme for the show was composed by Denis King. A vocal version was released as a single by Stutz Bear Cats.

== Other media ==
Writer David Butler produced a novel called We'll Meet Again: The End of an Era that continued the story beyond the TV series.
