= Lou Hirsch =

American born actor active in the United Kingdom (born 1955)

- Born: 27 February 1955 (age 71); Brooklyn, New York, USA
- Occupation: Actor
- Years active: 1979–2011

Lou Hirsch (born 27 February 1955) is an American born actor. He is best known for playing supporting roles such as Arnie Kowlaski in the sitcom My Hero, Wallace in Episodes, Donut in Kappatoo, Fred in Superman III (1983), Officer Silas Romek in Space Precinct, Jones in The Tomorrow People, Monty in Stay Lucky, Headmaster Widdlesome in Thunderbirds (2004) and the voice of Baby Herman in Who Framed Roger Rabbit (1988). During his career, he was primarily based in the United Kingdom, specialising in playing American roles in various theatre productions, film and TV programs.

== Biography ==
Hirsch studied at the University of Miami and Guildhall School of Music and Drama; one of his classmates at the latter was future Star Trek: The Next Generation actress Marina Sirtis. For six months he studied at the Lee Strasberg Theatre & Film Institute in New York, before he abruptly left, citing disagreements with Strasberg's teaching techniques. In 1979, he moved to London and joined the Cambridge Theatre Company appearing in From the Greek by Frederick Raphel. The following year he appeared in a touring production of Anna Christie with the Royal Shakespeare Company.

== Career ==
In 1982, Hirsch made his television debut as Sgt. Hymie Stutz in the LWT mini-series We'll Meet Again about USAF personnel stationed in a English village during World War II. On television he has appeared in Whoops Apocalypse, Dempsey and Makepeace, The Equalizer, The New Statesman, Stay Lucky, Paul Merton: The Series, Jeeves and Wooster, Takin' Over the Asylum, The Tales of Para Handy and Operation Good Guys. Between 1982 to 1986, Hirsch made recurring appearances as part of the ensemble cast in the sketch show The Kenny Everett Television Show. Hirsch's film roles include The Lonely Lady (1983), Superman III (1983), Insignificance (1985), The American Way (1986), Haunted Honeymoon (1986), Wild West (1992) Tom & Viv (1994) and Thunderbirds (2004).

Hirsch is best known for voicing the adult voice of Baby Herman in Who Framed Roger Rabbit (1988). He originally auditioned for a live action role in the film, but was eventually hired to voice Herman, despite having no prior experience as a voice actor. He described the voice as a combination of Wallace Beery and his (British) friends' imitation of him. Following the film's release, Hirsch reprised the role in three animated shorts, including Tummy Trouble (1989), Roller Coaster Rabbit (1990) and Trail Mix-Up (1993).

In 1991, Hirsch appeared in a rare lead role as Raymond Gold in the ScreenPlay episode "The Fallout Guy", an immature 39-year-old fantasist who works as a chemical engineer, whom also has a double life as a spy, selling nuclear secrets to the Russians; the original play was loosely based on the life of Harry Gold. The episode subsequently won the 1990 Radio Times Drama Award.

During the nineties, he had recurring roles in a number of children's programs, including Gophers!, Kappatoo and The Tomorrow People. He appeared as alien policeman Officer Silas Romek in Space Precinct, produced by Gerry Anderson, which was one of the most expensive TV shows ever produced in the UK, using a combination of science fiction and police procedural. Between 2000 and 2006, Hirsch appeared in all six series of My Hero as Arnie Kowlaski, a former superhero who was stripped off his powers after abusing them, and also the cousin of George Sunday (aka Thermoman).

In 2011, Hirsch appeared as Wallace in Episodes, a forgetful security guard who works at the Beverley Hills estate where Sean and Beverly live during the course of the first series.

== Stage work ==
Hirsch has appeared in a number of theatre productions. He played George in Of Mice and Men, which he first played in 1983 alongside Clive Mantle as Lennie; he reprised the role 13 years later in a national tour, again with Mantle. He played Oscar in a 1991 production of The Odd Couple at the Watford Palace, Jerry in The Road to Nirvana at The Traverse in 1995, Shelley Levene in Glengarry Glen Ross at the Royal Lyceum in 2001, Barton Keyes in Double Indemity at the Nottingham Playhouse in 2004, and appeared as Al Lewis in The Sunshine Boys at the West Yorkshire Playhouse in 2007.

== Personal life ==
Hisch moved back to the U.S. in 2017, and currently resides in Florida.

== Selected filmography ==
Year	Title	Role	Notes
1982	We'll Meet Again	Sgt. Hymie Stutz	13 episodes (mini-series)
1982	Whoops Apocalypse	Jed Grodd	2 episodes
1982 – 1986	The Kenny Everett Television Show	Various	13 episodes
1983	The Lonely Lady	Bernie	Film
1983	Superman III	Fred	Film
1984	Danger: Marmalade at Work	Small Sam	Episode: "Shame"
1984	The Lenny Henry Show	Various	1 episode
1984	Oxbridge Blues	Sidney	Episode: "He'll See You Now"
1985	Dempsey and Makepeace	Wee Jock	Episode: "Tequila Sunrise"
1985	Insignificance	Charlie	Film
1986	The American Way	Vet 1	Film
1986	Haunted Honeymoon	Sponsor	Film
1986	The Last Days of Patton	Dexter	TV movie
1987	The Equalizer	Counter Clerk	Episode: "A Place to Stay"
1988	Deadline	Monty	TV movie
1988	Who Framed Roger Rabbit	Baby Herman (voice)	Film
1988	You Must Be the Husband	Hal	Episode: "In Sickness and in Health"
1989	The New Statesman	Houghton Mifflin	Episode: "California Here I Come"
1989	Stay Lucky	Monty	3 episodes
1989	Tummy Trouble	Baby Herman (voice)	Short
1990	Gophers!	Chuck Gopher, Nacho (voice)	4 episodes
1990	Roller Coaster Rabbit	Baby Herman (voice)	Short
1990 – 1992	Kappatoo	Donut	10 episodes
1991	Paul Merton: The Series	Jim Weaver	1 episode
1991	ScreenPlay	Raymond Gold	Episode: "The Fallout Guy"
1992	Jeeves and Wooster	Jimmy Mundy	Episode: "The Full House"
1992	Strathblair	Donald Telfer	Episode: "Coming to Terms"
1992	The Tomorrow People	Jones	4 episodes
1992	Wild West	Hank Goldstein	Film
1993	Mr Don & Mr George	Hollywood Producer	Episode: "No Wasps"
1993	Trail Mix-Up	Baby Herman (voice)	Short
1994	Takin' Over the Asylum	American Consultant	Episode: "Fly Like an Eagle"
1994	Tom & Viv	Captain Todd	Film
1994 – 1995	Space Precinct	Officer Silas Romek	20 episodes
1995	The Tales of Para Handy	John Cody	Episode: "The Mallingerer"
1996	Over Here	Tomasz	1 episode
1997	Coronation Street: Viva Las Vegas!	Dino DiCatalano	Video
1998	Operation Good Guys	Lou Friskham-Farino	Episode: "Frisk 'em"
2000 – 2006	My Hero	Arnie Kowlaski	50 episodes
2004	Thunderbirds	Headmaster Widdlesome	Film
2011	Episodes	Wallace	3 episodes
