= Colette Hiller =

American actress

- Occupation: Actress
- Years active: 1979–1994

Colette Hiller is an American film, theatre and television actress. She attended the Performing Arts Academy in New York as a teenager, and appeared in the original musical play of Annie, and in other films and plays such as The Lonely Lady, Ragtime, Strong Medicine, and Birth of the Beatles. She played Corporal Colette Ferro in the 1986 film Aliens. In 1982, she appeared in the short lived late night show O.T.T. This was an adult spin off of kids TV show Tiswas on ITV, produced by the new Central TV company. It ran for 1 series. Hiller has also worked for the BBC, creating documentaries such as Too Clever by Half and the children's music cassette Applehead.

As its Creative Director, Hiller was instrumental in setting up SingLondon in 2007. In 2009, in addition to various song related events, Hiller drove the Street Pianos project which saw pianos placed in London's public spaces, and freely available for people to play. The SingLondon project went on to spawn PingLondon, a project which in 2010 placed ping pong tables around London and, in 2011, the major cities of the UK. Also in 2011, SingLondon produced Search Party which took the form of a treasure hunt across London culminating in a party and which was part of the Cultural Olympiad in the run up to the 2012 Olympics. 2011 also saw SingLondon and Hiller's involvement with Keep Britain Tidy in the form of the singing bins initiative.

== Filmography ==
Year	Title	Role	Notes
1979	Birth of the Beatles	Reporter	
1980	Oppenheimer	Barbara Chevalier	Episode: Part 2
1981	Ragtime	Lawyer's Female Companion No. 1	
1983	The Lonely Lady	Actress in Restaurant	
1986	Aliens	Corporal Colette Ferro	
1986	Strong Medicine	Amy	TV movie
1990	Perfect Scoundrels	Honey	Episode: Blue Kisses
1991	Paul Merton: The Series		Episode 3
1994	Space Precinct	Officer Aurelia Took (voice)	8 episodes
