= Gophers! =

- Created by: Mark Mason
- Starring: Lou Hirsch; Francis Wright; Erik Collinson; Jeremy Stockwell
- Country of origin: United Kingdom
- Original language: English
- No. of series: 1
- No. of episodes: 13

Original release
- Network: Channel 4
- Release: 2 January – 1 July 1990

Gophers! is a Channel 4 children's programme about a family of American gophers who move into a new neighbourhood, called Sycamore Heights, living next door to a family of uptight but well-intentioned rabbits, The Burrows.

There were many recurring jokes within this short-lived show such as Arthur Burrows' vegetables planning a rebellion to escape his garden, a mad scientist ferret called Dr Wince, whose ambition was to conquer the world by obtaining a crystal buried in the Gophers' garden with the help of his reptilian servant Sly, and an alien in love with a zucchini determined to get home. Also there were stereotypical "Mexican" cockroaches (dressed in costumes of Mexican peasant revolutionaries of the Mexican Revolution of 1910) who lived in the Gophers' house or trailer park mobile home always trying to steal their food.

The series won the WorldFest Houston Gold Award for Outstanding Comedy Series in 1990 and was sold to 67 countries. The characters used a mix of animatronic costumes and puppetry.
