= Edward Rowe (actor) =

Cornish actor

- Mab Tregarrek
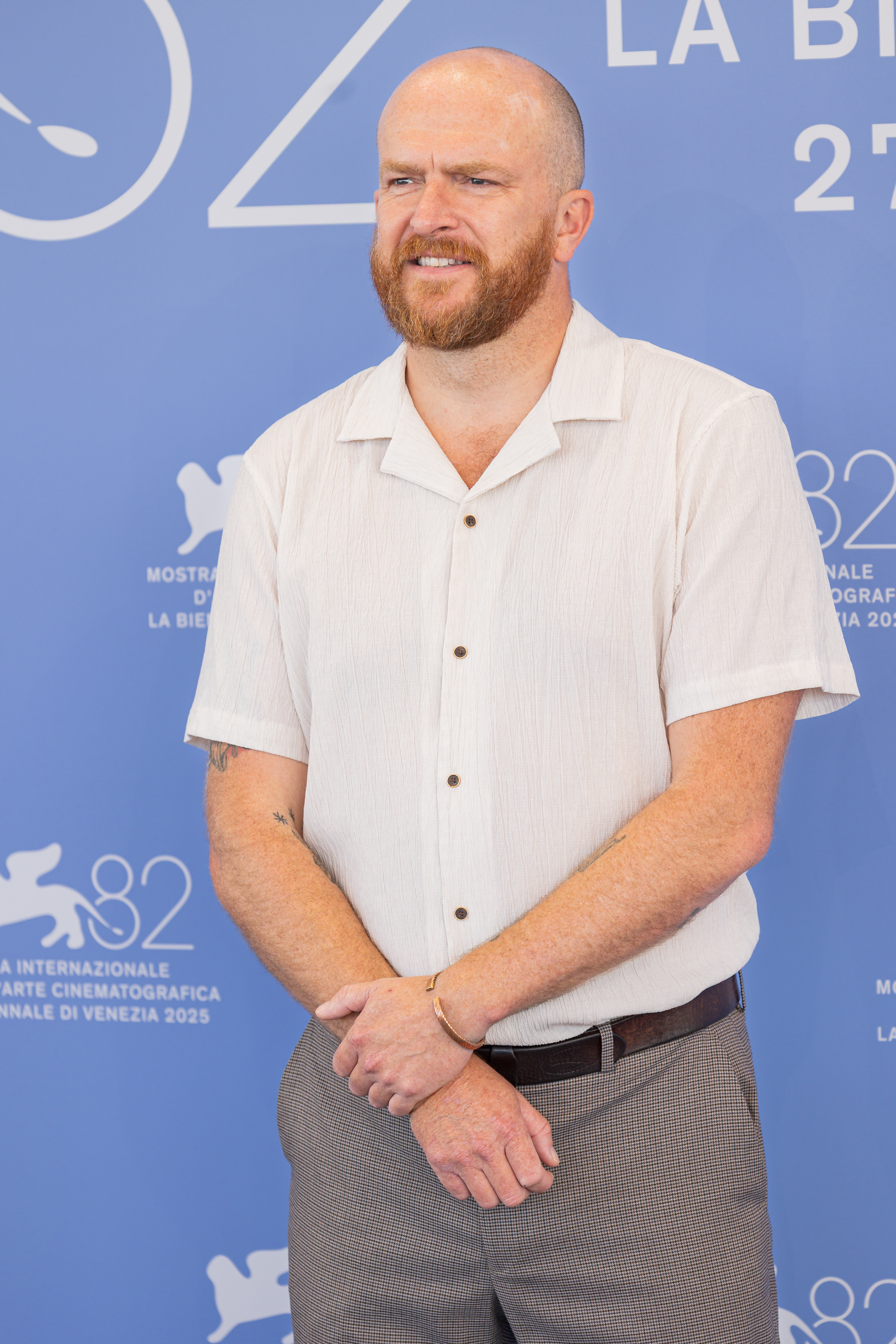
- Rowe in 2025 at the 82nd Venice International Film Festival
- Occupation: Actor
- Years active: 2010s–present
- Notable credits: Bait; The Witcher; Enys Men

Edward Rowe is a Cornish actor, known for the lead role as a struggling fisherman in the BAFTA-winning film Bait and for the Kernow King character.

== Early life ==
Rowe is from Roche in Cornwall where he started his standup routine and YouTube video series. He attended Poltair School from the age of 11 to 16.

== Career ==
=== Early career and Kernow King ===
His Kernow King character features a strong Cornish identity and speaks in a strong Cornish accent. In mid 2010 he produced a series of short comedy videos on Cornish themes, often in the spoof documentary format. Examples include the Camborne Maid's song remake of musician Billy Joel's "Uptown Girl". This led to a 2014 standup tour, Splann!.

Rowe wrote an opinion piece for The Guardian in 2012 criticising the proposed pasty tax. In 2015, he starred in Kernow King's sex tape, an educational film produced by Cornwall Council's Health Promotion Service. This was nominated for the UK Sexual Health Awards. Rowe was made a bard of Gorsedh Kernow in 2015 "for his work as an ambassador for the Cornish identity", taking the bardic name Mab Tregarrek (transl. Son of Roche).

In 2017, he starred in the Hall for Cornwall's Christmas show, Sleeping Beauty.

In 2018, he wrote and starred in the play Hireth, about a Cornish miner, and starred in Trevithick!, a biographical comedy about Richard Trevithick directed by Kneehigh Theatre's Simon Harvey.

=== Bait ===
Rowe found breakthrough success for his lead role in Bait, a film by Mark Jenkin. He was longlisted for Best Actor and Most Promising Newcomer at the 2019 British Independent Film Awards.

=== Post-Bait career ===
He has appeared in a number of television shows which include The Witcher as King Henselt of Kaedwen, House of the Dragon as Ser Howland Sharp, and Beyond Paradise as Matthew Colbert. He also voiced the character Godfrey/Hoarah Loux in 2022 video game Elden Ring and starred as The Boatman in Jenkin's 2022 film Enys Men.

In 2022, Rowe called Channel 4's Finding the Cornish Dream series "abhorrent" and "deeply disrespectful" at a time when "[m]ost of us are scraping along making sure we make our mortgage payments."

== Filmography ==
=== Film ===
Year	Title	Role	Notes
2015	Kernow King's Poldark	Ross Poldark	
2019	Bait	Martin Ward	
2020	An Tarow	Mal	
2020	Frayed Edges	Narrator	
2021	Dog Years	Lawrence	
2022	Enys Men	The Boatman	
2022	Tresor	Animus	
2022	Let's Not Do This Tonight	Eduardo	
2023	Mowes	Chris	
2023	Conti	Roman Foster	
2024	Edge of Summer	Pete	
2025	Rose of Nevada	Mike	
2025	For Better	Officer Craig	

=== Television ===
Year	Title	Role	Notes
2016	Delicious	Duncan	
2021	Alex Rider	PC Harry Elsom	
2021–2025	The Witcher	King Henselt	2 episodes
2022	House of the Dragon	Ser Howland Sharp	Episode: "Second of His Name"
2022	Strike	Dave Polworth	
2023	Beyond Paradise	Matthew Colbert	
2025	Shakespeare & Hathaway: Private Investigators	Sly Forrester	

=== Video games ===
Year	Title	Role
2022	Elden Ring	Godfrey
2026	Crimson Desert	Various
	Corsair Cove	Captain Teach
