= Simone Bendix =

Danish actress (born 1967)

- Born: 26 September 1967 (age 58)
- Education: Bristol Old Vic Theatre School
- Occupation: Actress
- Years active: 1985–present
- Television: Space Precinct
- Spouse: Kasper Winding (m. 1987)
- Children: Pablo Winding; Polly Winding

Simone Bendix (born 26 September 1967) is a Danish actress.

== Career ==
Bendix trained at the Bristol Old Vic Theatre School. In addition to the 1994 Gerry Anderson science-fiction drama Space Precinct, in which she played the regular role of Officer Jane Castle, her television appearances include The Young Indiana Jones Chronicles (1993), Between the Lines (1993), The Tomorrow People (1994), Lie Down with Lions (1994) The Crow Road (1996) and A Many Splintered Thing (2000).

She has also appeared in Bugs, The Inspector Lynley Mysteries, The Last Detective, Taggart and A Touch of Frost. Bendix featured in a 1998 TV advertisement for Nescafé Gold Blend opposite Neil Roberts (the last of the Gold Blend couple adverts).

== Personal life ==
She is married to Kasper Winding. They have a son, Pablo, and a daughter, Polly.
