= Lighthouse (1999 film) =

- Directed by: Simon Hunter
- Written by: Graeme Scarfe
- Produced by: Tim Dennison; Mark Leake; Chris Craib
- Starring: James Purefoy; Rachel Shelley; Christopher Adamson; Don Warrington
- Cinematography: Tony Imi
- Edited by: Paul Green
- Music by: Debbie Wiseman
- Distributed by: Winchester Films
- Release dates: 17 November 1999 (Sweden); 17 July 2002 (United Kingdom)
- Running time: 95 minutes
- Country: United Kingdom
- Language: English
- Budget: $1,800,000

Lighthouse (released as Dead of Night in the United States) is a 1999 British horror film directed by Simon Hunter. The film follows survivors of a shipwreck being preyed on by an escaped psychotic convict who beheads his victims. It was shot in Cornwall for the main locations (lighthouse, beaches rockshores), and Hastings in East Sussex.

== Plot ==
Police psychologist Dr McCloud finishes the profile of serial killer Leo Rook, and flashes back to the day police found his hideout. Two months later, prison ship Hyperion is traveling to Marshalsea Island prison. Rook kills a guard, as well as the female guard who helped him escape, and steals a lifeboat. Traveling to a nearby lighthouse island, he kills most of the keepers and deactivates the lighthouse, causing the ship to crash.

Survivors, including McCloud, epileptic prisoner Spader, alcoholic captain Campbell, and several prisoners and guards, make their way to the island. Turning the power back on, guard Hopkins has his throat slit by Rook. Officer Goslet is asked to make coffee, and finds the decapitated body of one of the lighthouse keepers in a closet.

Taking a break from trying to fix the radio, Campbell uses the lighthouse’s restroom. Within the stall, he hears Rook approaching. He manages to hide until Rook leaves, but accidentally alerts him. Rook returns upstairs and kills Campbell with a machete.

As the other gather together inside the lighthouse, McCloud tells the others of Rook’s presence. Venturing upstairs, they find the radio on fire. Putting out the fire, they go to the lighthouse’s restroom, where the toilet overflows with Campbell’s blood.

Voting on whether to stay or leave, the majority choose to leave, yet O’Neil insists they stay and fight Rook. Leaving with supplies, the group find their lifeboat on fire, preventing any escape. Goslet has a mental break and runs down the surf, trying to swim for it. Spader gives chase, and O’Neill is killed trying to search for them.

Back at the lighthouse, convict Weevil finds a morse transmitter, which he restores to working order. However, the building blocks the signal, so they would need to go outside. Spader devises a plan to burn Rook with molotov cocktails. While waiting for Rook to enter the building, McCloud falls asleep, and has a nightmare reliving seeing Rook kill her mother. When she wakes up, Spader comforts her, calming her down. The group think they see Rook entering the lighthouse and attack, but accidentally kill the remaining lighthouse keeper instead.

Spoons and Weevil, who were chained together by O’Neil, are chased by Rook. They fall off a cliffside, Spoons being knocked unconscious in the process. As Rook gets closer, Weevil is forced to chop off Spoons’ hand in order to escape.

Spader goes outside to search for Spoons and Weevil, while Goslet and McCloud wait in the generator room. Weevil makes it to the door, but the others cannot hear his cries for help over the noise of the generator. When the two finally notice, Weevil is decapitated by Rook by the time they open the door.

Goslet is fatally stabbed by Rook, who corners McCloud. She is saved by Spader, and the two flee higher up the lighthouse. However, the flashing lights cause Spader to have a seizure. McCloud smashes the light, snapping Spader out of it. The two flee as Rook breaks down the door with an ax.

McCloud tries climbing down the lighthouse using a rope winch. Rook fights with Spader, inadvertently destroying the winch, which almost falls off the tower. As Spader climbs higher up the lighthouse, the injured Goslet manages to radio Spader, who asks him to start the generator. Rook attacks Spader, and they fall to the floor below, Rook crashing into the lighthouse light. Spader has Goslet activate the generator, which causes Rook to be electrocuted.

Spader and McCloud climb down using the rope, but Rook revives and attacks them. Rook is finally killed by being set on fire, falling off the lighthouse tower to the rocks below.

As the rope finally breaks, Spader and McCloud manage to swing into the lighthouse. Spader comforts McCloud, and the sprinklers put the fire out. As the sun rises, help finally arrives.

== Cast ==
- James Purefoy as Richard Spader
- Christopher Adamson as Leo Rook
- Rachel Shelley as Dr. Kirsty McCloud
- Don Warrington as Prison Officer Ian Goslet
- Paul Brooke as Captain Campbell
- Chris Dunne as Chief Prison Officer O'Neil
- Pat Kelman as Spoons
- Bob Goody as Weevil
- Peter McCabe as Prison Officer Hopkins
- Norman Mitchell as Brownlow
- Howard Attfield as Sykes
- Jason Round as Spitfield
- Sarah Wateridge as McCloud's Mother
- Rod Woodruff as Guard

== Release ==
=== Home media ===
The film was released on DVD under its alternate title Dead of Night by Image Entertainment on 30 May 2000. It was later released by VVL on 21 April 2003.

== Reception ==
Peter Bradshaw from The Guardian gave the film a negative review, calling it "[a] straightforward, unimaginative slasher picture". Shephen Holden from The New York Times called it "[a] grade-C British horror thriller", but also stated that the film was not without its crude pretensions. Kim Newman from Empire awarded the film a negative two out of five stars, calling it "uneven". Dennis Dermody of TV Guide gave the film one out of four stars, calling it a "lame British horror picture, which features plenty of arterial spray but few scares." Jamie Russell from BBC rated the film two out of five stars, stating that the film's promising start was ruined by hammy acting, an unnecessary romantic sub-plot, and a lack of explanation for the killer's actions.
