= Future Cop (TV series) =

- Genre: Science fiction
- Created by: Anthony Wilson; Allen S. Epstein
- Starring: Ernest Borgnine; Michael J. Shannon; John Amos; James Daughton
- Composer: J. J. Johnson
- Country of origin: United States
- Original language: English
- No. of seasons: 1
- No. of episodes: 8 (list of episodes)

Production
- Executive producers: Anthony Wilson; Gary Damsker
- Running time: 60 minutes
- Production companies: The Culzean Corporation; Tovern Productions; Paramount Television

Original release
- Network: ABC
- Release: May 1, 1976 – March 28, 1978

Future Cop is an American crime drama science fiction television series that starred Ernest Borgnine and Michael J. Shannon. It was based on the TV movie of the same title and predated RoboCop by ten years. The series was aired on ABC in 1977 and was re-piloted as Cops and Robin on NBC in 1978. A veteran street cop gets an experimental android that has been programmed by the police lab for his new partner.

== Cast ==
- Ernest Borgnine – Off. Joe Cleaver
- Michael J. Shannon – Off. John Haven
- John Amos – Off. Bill Bundy

== Episodes ==
=== TV Movie (1976) ===
| Title | Directed by | Written by | Original release date |
|---|---|---|---|
| "Future Cop" | Jud Taylor | Anthony Wilson | May 1, 1976 |

=== Season 1 ===
| No. | Title | Directed by | Written by | Original release date |
|---|---|---|---|---|
| 1 | "Fighting O'Haven" | Robert Douglas | Mann Rubin | March 5, 1977 |
| 2 | "The Mad Mad Bomber" | Ted Post | T : Harold Livingston; S/T : Ken Kolb | March 25, 1977 |
| 3 | "The Girl on the Ledge" | Earl Bellamy | Mann Rubin | April 7, 1977 |
| 4 | "The Carlisle Girl" | Vincent McEveety | Harold Livingston | April 22, 1977 |
| 5 | "The Kansas City Kid" | Robert Douglas | Harold Livingston | April 30, 1977 |

== List of Cops and Robin episodes with airdates ==
1. "Cops and Robin" (March 28, 1978)

== Plagiarism lawsuit ==
Writers Harlan Ellison and Ben Bova filed a lawsuit against Paramount Television, ex-Paramount exec Terry Keegan, and ABC-TV, alleging that Future Cop was plagiarized from their own pitch for a TV series, which was based on their 1970 short story "Brillo." The lawsuit was settled in 1980, awarding Ellison and Bova $182,500 in compensatory damages and $154,500 in punitive damages. The story's title was allegedly a pun by Bova, as a robot policeman could be referred to as "metal fuzz", like Brillo soap pads.

== Home media ==
On March 1, 2016, Mill Creek Entertainment released the complete series on DVD in Region 1.

== See also ==
To date, there have been five other short-lived American TV series with identical premises:

- Holmes & Yoyo (1976)
- Automan (1983)
- Mann & Machine (1992)
- Total Recall 2070 (1999)
- Almost Human (2013)
