= Mary Woodvine =

English actress (born 1967)

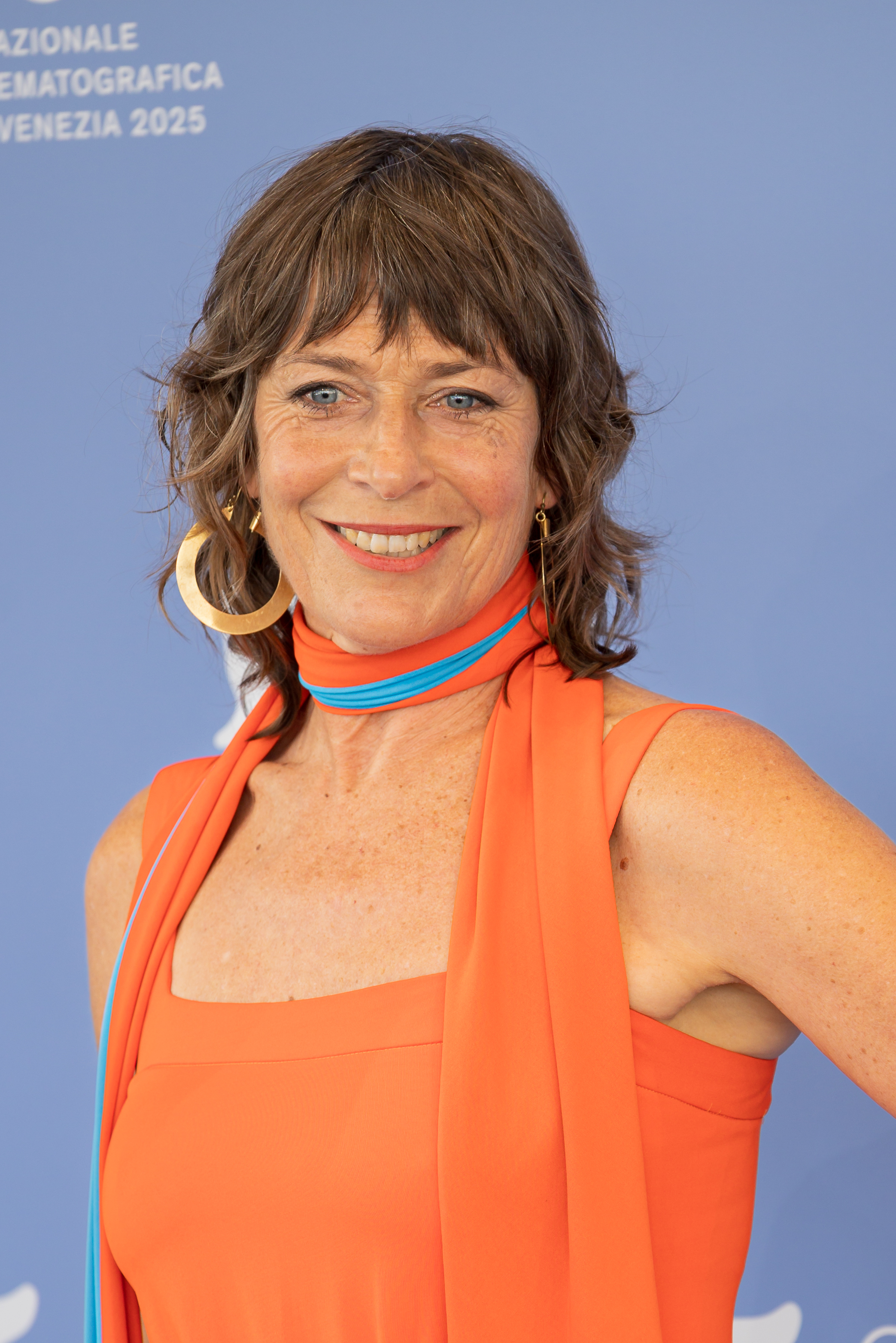
- Woodvine in 2025
- Born: Mary Louise Woodvine; 14 July 1967 (age 59); Hammersmith, London, England
- Education: Royal Welsh College of Music & Drama
- Occupation: Actress
- Years active: 1991–present
- Partner: Mark Jenkin
- Family: John Woodvine (father)

Mary Louise Woodvine (born 14 July 1967) is an English actress who appeared as Mary Harkinson in the BBC soap EastEnders in 2003. Her father was the actor John Woodvine.

== Early life ==
Woodvine was born in Queen Charlotte's Hospital, Hammersmith, London to the actors Hazel Wright and John Woodvine.

She trained at the Royal Welsh College of Music & Drama and was a core member of Kneehigh Theatre.

== Career ==
Woodvine has performed in Doc Martin, Born and Bred, Doctors, Noah's Ark, Our Friends in the North, Casualty, The Jury, Pie in the Sky, Grafters, Wycliffe, Down to Earth, Heartbeat and Murder City. In 1994, she played Aurelia Took in the science-fiction drama TV series Space Precinct. She also appeared as Miss Lamplighter in The Worst Witch (1998–2001), from 2005 to 2006, as Judge Morag Hughes in five episodes of Judge John Deed, and she also appears as Mrs. Teague in the 2015 TV series of Poldark.

In 2003, she starred as Evangeline Blight in the Cornish-language short film Blight, co-starring Richard Coyle. Woodvine starred in the award-winning 2007 psychological thriller film The Lark which premièred at the Cambridge Film Festival.

Woodvine, along with Rory Wilton, Jerome Wright and Kirsty Osmon, developed poet Murray Lachlan Young's first play, The Incomers, during a residency at The Space, Dartington Hall Trust. Woodvine created the role of Celia through a series of workshops and in the production's inaugural tour, which ran from April to May 2013.

Woodvine starred in the 2019 film Bait, a drama film written and directed by her partner Mark Jenkin, and in 2022 played the lead role in his next film Enys Men. She also featured in his 2025 film Rose of Nevada, for which she also contributed the story.

== Filmography ==
=== Film ===
Year	Film	Role	Notes
2000	Maisie's Catch	Unknown	Short
2006	The 12 Inch Pianist	The Delivery Woman	Short
2007	The Midnight Drives	Cafe Owner	
2007	Dressing Granite	Jenny	
2007	The Lark	Niamh	
2007	New Boots	Susan	Short
2011	Intruders	Teacher	
2015	Bronco's House	The Sister	Short
2017	Stalemate	Liz	Short
2019	Bait	Sandra Leigh	
2021	Why Would You?	Brenda	
2022	The Birdwatcher	The Veteran	Short
2022	Mab Hudel	Mam	Short
2022	Enys Men	The Volunteer	
2024	Daddy's Head	Mary	
2025	Rose of Nevada	Mrs Richards	also contributed story

=== Television ===
Year	Film	Role	Notes
1991	Shrinks	Sarah Neale	Episode: "Episode #1.4"
1992–2006	Heartbeat	Cath Wainwright / Susie	2 episodes
1993	15: The Life and Death of Philip Knight	Margaret Harris's assistant	Television film
1993–2003	Eastenders	Mary / Melanie	7 episodes
1993–2006	Casualty	Stella Snowden / WPC Gowell / Andrea	5 episodes
1994–1995	Space Precinct	Officer Aurelia Took	25 episodes
1996	The Tide of Life	Lizzie Rowan	3 episodes
1996	Our Friends in the North	Alison	Episode: "1979"
1996	Element of Doubt	Lucy	Television film
1997	McLibel!	Jane Laporte	Episode: "Episode #1.2"
1997	Wycliffe	Margaret Ezzard	Episode: "On Account"
1997	Pie in the Sky	P.C. Jane Morton	7 episodes
1998	Noah's Ark	Jan Richardson	Episode: "Deep Waters"
1998	Grafters	Mary	3 episodes
2000	Badger	Mary Fletcher	Episode: "Troubled Waters"
2001	The Worst Witch	Lynne Lamplighter	Episode: "Art Wars"
2001	Down to Earth	Michelle	2 episodes
2003	Born and Bred	Aggie Driscoll	2 episodes
2003	The Bill	Kim Galanski	Episode: "Twenty-Twenty Hindsight"
2004–2015	Doc Martin	Joy Cronk	4 episodes
2005–2006	Judge John Deed	Morag Hughes	7 episodes
2006	Murder City	Erica Drummond	Episode: "Wives and Lovers"
2006	Coming Up	Vicky	Episode: "The Animator"
2007	Doctors	Sally West	4 episodes
2011	Nettlecatfish	Mum	TV short
2011	The Jury	Alison Lowther	Episode: "Episode #2.2"
2015	Poldark	Mrs Teague	3 episodes
2016	Delicious	Nurse Victoria	Episode: "Death Comes to All"
