= Cornwall College =

Cornwall College may refer to:

- The Cornwall College Group, in Cornwall and Devon, England
- Cornwall College, Jamaica
- Cornwall Collegiate and Vocational School, Cornwall, Ontario, Canada
