= Mark Jenkin =

English filmmaker (born 1976)

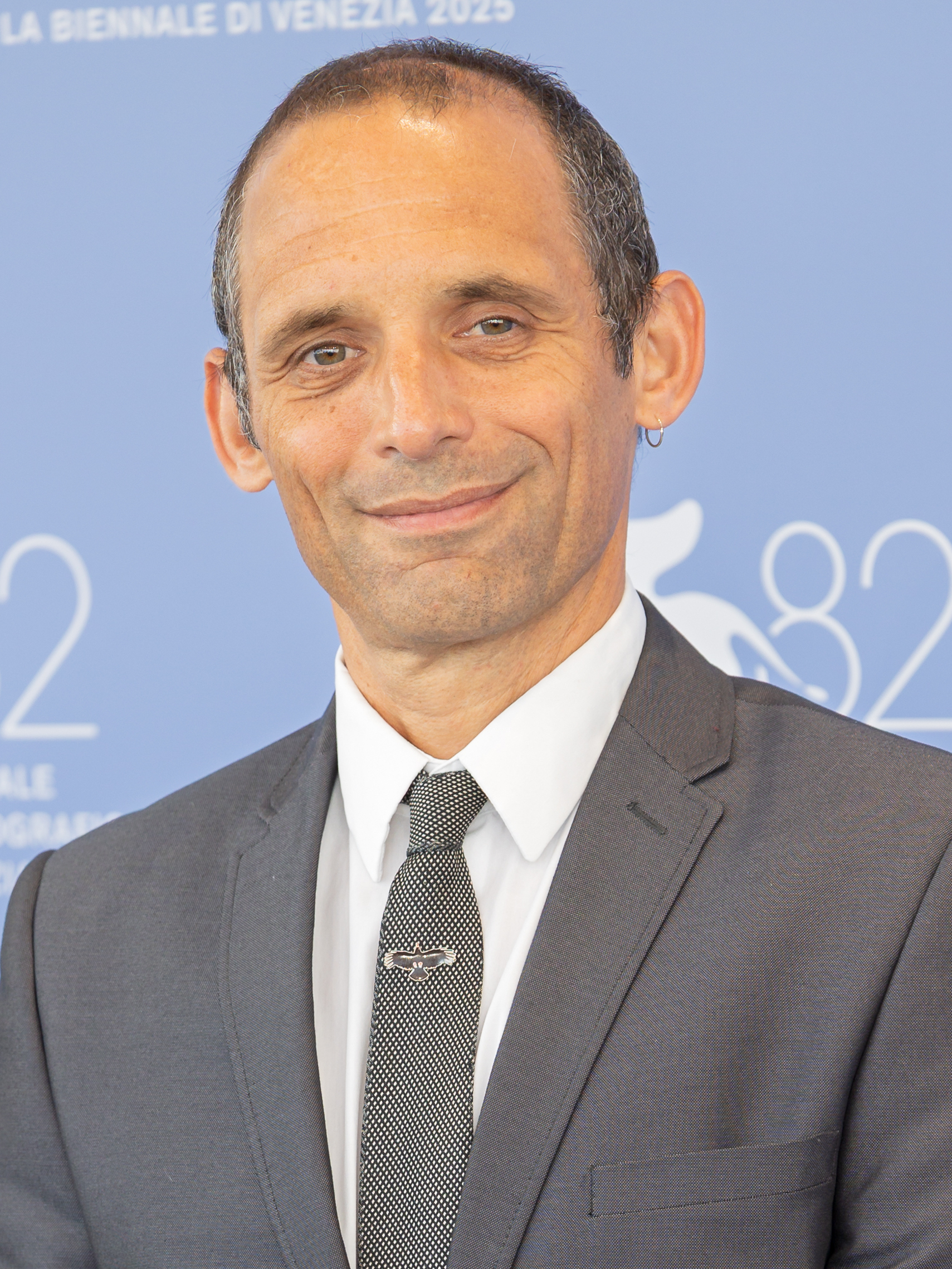
- Jenkin in 2025
- Born: 1976 (age 49–50); Newlyn, Cornwall, England
- Occupations: director; film editor; screenwriter; cinematographer; producer
- Years active: 2002–present
- Partner: Mary Woodvine
- Website: markjenkin.co.uk

Mark Jenkin (born 1976) is a director, editor, screenwriter, cinematographer and producer best known for Bait (2019), which earned him a BAFTA Award for Outstanding Debut by a British Writer, Director or Producer.

== Career ==
Jenkin is a descendant of Alfred Wallis, an artist and fisherman.

Jenkin won the Frank Copplestone First Time Director Award at The Celtic Film & Television Festival in 2002 for his debut film Golden Burn. He followed this success with documentaries, shorts and low-budget feature films including The Man Who Needed a Traffic Light, The Rabbit and The Lobsterman, a documentary on the life of Cornish playwright Nick Darke. His 2007 feature film The Midnight Drives was described by Derek Malcolm, film critic for The Evening Standard as "A moving film about parentage with an exceptional performance from Colin Holt at its centre".

Jenkin wrote and directed the 2019 drama film Bait, starring Edward Rowe and Jenkin's partner Mary Woodvine.

In 2020, Jenkin was recognised as a Cornish Bard for his work in promoting Cornwall’s heritage. In 2022, he created two music videos for the band the Smile.

== Filmography ==
=== Feature films ===
| Year | Title | Notes |
|---|---|---|
| 2002 | Golden Burn | Also editor |
| 2004 | The Rabbit | Also editor |
| 2007 | The Midnight Drives | Also editor |
| 2011 | Happy Christmas | |
| 2019 | Bait | Also editor |
| 2022 | Enys Men | Also editor |
| 2025 | Rose of Nevada | Also editor |

=== Short films ===
- 2003: The Man Who Needed a Traffic Light – also writer
- 2009: Aurora's Kiss – also writer
- 2012: Last Post
- 2013: Cape Cornwall Calling / All the White Horses – also writer
- 2015: Bronco's House – also writer
- 2016: Enough to Fill Up an Egg Cup – also writer/director of photography
- 2016: Dear Marianne – also writer
- 2016: The Essential Cornishman – also writer
- 2017: The Road to Zennor – also writer
- 2017: Tomato – also writer
- 2018: Vertical Shapes in a Horizontal Landscape – also writer
- 2018 David Bowie Is Dead – also writer/editor
- 2019: Hard, Cracked the Wind
- 2020: 29 Hour Long Birthday – also writer

=== Other credits ===
- 1999: Walking with Dinosaurs – Production assistant
- 2004: The Wrecking Season – Editor
- 2004: New Reed – Cinematographer/editor
- 2007: The Lark – Editor
