= Space Precinct =

British science fiction television series

- Genre: Science fiction; Police procedural
- Created by: Gerry Anderson
- Starring: Simone Bendix; Lou Hirsch; Richard James; Nick Klein; Joseph Mydell; Megan Olive; Nancy Paul; David Quilter; Ted Shackelford; Jerome Willis; Mary Woodvine; Rob Youngblood
- Voices of: Colette Hiller; Kieron Jecchinis; Gary Martin; David Healy
- Music by: Crispin Merrell
- Country of origin: United Kingdom
- Original language: English
- No. of series: 1
- No. of episodes: 24

Production
- Executive producer: Tom Gutteridge
- Producer: Gerry Anderson
- Cinematography: Alan Hume; Tony Spratling
- Editors: Sue Robinson; Jason Krasucki; Robin McDonell; Brian Freemantle; Matthew Glen
- Running time: 43 minutes
- Production companies: Gerry Anderson Productions; Grove Television Enterprises; Mentorn Films
- Budget: £20 million

Original release
- Release: 3 October 1994 – 24 July 1995

Space Precinct is a British television series that was first broadcast by syndication in the United States between 1994 and 1995. In the UK, it was first shown on channel Sky One between March and August 1995, and later BBC Two from September 1995 to March 1996. Many US stations scheduled the show in late night time periods, which resulted in low ratings and contributed to its cancellation. The series was based on an unbroadcast 1986 pilot movie titled Space Police, featuring Shane Rimmer.

The series was created by Gerry Anderson and was a combination of science fiction and police procedural.

== Premise ==
The series features American actor Ted Shackelford as former NYPD detective Patrick Brogan, now a lieutenant with the Demeter City police force on the planet Altor in the star system Epsilon Eridani. Brogan and his partner Jack Haldane (played by Rob Youngblood) must adjust to living in another star system, and investigating crimes being committed by aliens as well as humans. Also featuring was Danish actress Simone Bendix as Officer Jane Castle, Haldane's love interest (Brogan was happily married with a wife, daughter and son who relocated to Demeter City with him). All other major characters were played by actors wearing complex make-up that also included elements of puppetry to depict the different alien races. Brogan's badge, number 2040, was used in the opening credits, resulting in the common misconception that the show is set in 2040.

== Characters ==
=== Brogan family ===
- Ted Shackelford as Lieutenant Patrick Brogan
- Nancy Paul as Sally Brogan
- Nick Klein as Matthew Brogan
- Megan Olive as Elizabeth Brogan

=== Demeter City Police ===
- Rob Youngblood as Officer Jack Haldane
- Simone Bendix as Officer Jane Castle
- Joseph Mydell as Officer Lionel Carson
- Gary Martin as the voice of Slomo – Station 88's robot computer

==== Creons ====
- Jerome Willis as Captain Rexton Podly
- Lou Hirsch as Officer Silas Romek
- Richard James as Officer Hubble Orrin
- Kieron Jecchinis as the voice of Officer Hubble Orrin
- Tom Watt as Officer Beezle (four episodes)
- Gary Martin as the voice of Officer Beezle (four episodes)

==== Tarns ====
- Mary Woodvine as Officer Aurelia Took
- Colette Hiller as the voice of Officer Aurelia Took
- David Quilter as Sergeant Thorald Fredo

==== Other characters ====
Appearing as various guest aliens: Rob Thirtle, Leigh Tinkler, Andy Dawson, Joanna Berns, Wayne Forester, Alexa Rosewood, Ken Whitfield, and Will Barton. Idris Elba makes a brief appearance in one episode as a pizza delivery man, with his voice dubbed by David Healy.

== Episodes ==
The dates of broadcast shown are the US first syndication dates.

No.	Title	Directed by	Written by	Original release date	Prod. code
1	"Protect and Survive"	John Glen	Paul Mayhew-Archer	3 October 1994	2
Brogan's informant Slik Ostrasky is murdered by Tylan Gershom, a smuggler of illegal Xyronite immigrants, and the only witness is slimy Melazoid business executive Armand Loyster. Brogan and Haldane are assigned to offer Loyster protection until he can testify at Gershom's trial. But Gershom plans to ensure that Loyster never reaches the courtroom.
2	"Enforcer"	Sidney Hayers	Marc Scott Zicree	10 October 1994	3
On Skall Street in Demeter City, members of the infamous Hydra Gang are found dead – their hearts shredded but not a single mark on their bodies. Accompanied by an orphaned alien girl, a new enforcer has taken over and the Skall Street traders soon discover that the Hydras have been replaced by something much worse.
3	"Body and Soul"	Sidney Hayers	Story by : Mark Harris; Teleplay by : Marc Scott Zicree	17 October 1994	6
Caught in the radiation field of Merlin's Asteroid, a prototype spaceship created by reclusive industrialist Alden Humes returns to Altor after being lost in space for twenty years. Brogan finds a body on board, beginning an investigation into a homicide that occurred two decades ago. As he tracks the killer, Brogan is haunted by the ghost in the machine.
4	"Double Duty"	Colin Bucksey	J. Larry Carroll & David Bennett Carren	24 October 1994	1
A drug war is raging in Demeter City and a professional assassin is killing the competition. The sole survivor of an attack on drug baron Oturi Nissim (Nickolas Grace) is a pretty alien girl, Aleesha Amyas, who is taken into protective custody. Suddenly the killer is loose in the Space Precinct House and Orrin is its first victim. Idris Elba appears briefly as a pizza deliveryman, with his voice dubbed by David Healy.
5	"The Snake"	John Glen	J. Larry Carroll & David Bennett Carren	31 October 1994	5
An alien extortionist and explosives expert, known only as The Snake, threatens the executives of Brett Interplanetary. Precinct 88 becomes a task force to find him and Jane becomes reacquainted with her old ECPF colleague Bill Gray. Then the Snake reveals his next target – the Princess, an Omega Class tanker en route to Altor with two hundred million gallons of liquefied hydrogen!
6	"Time to Kill"	Alan Birkinshaw	Hans Beimler & Richard Manning	7 November 1994	7
A routine sweep on a counterfeiting operation goes horribly wrong for the officers of Precinct 88 when they are suddenly attacked by an unstoppable Cyborg and Took is caught in the crossfire. The Cyborg has Brogan marked for death and, one by one, Brogan's colleagues are killed by the creature.
7	"Deadline"	John Glen	David Bennett Carren & J. Larry Carroll	14 November 1994	8
Brogan and Haldane discover a capsule containing the body of a Tarn male. The autopsy reveals that the tarn is missing vital organs, removed with surgical precision, and Brogan and Haldane find themselves on the trail of organleggers from Danae – killers who murder to sell body parts for profit, and target Brogan as their next donor.
8	"Seek and Destroy"	Jim Goddard	J. Larry Carroll & David Bennett Carren	21 November 1994	10
With the discovery of Aladine-50, a vaccine against creon fever, the importation of Earth dogs is all the rage in Demeter. Then three executives of Demeter Dogs Inc. are killed in mysterious circumstances and Brogan discovers a plot that heralds an invasion of Altor by the Omera, an army of nomadic alien killers.
9	"The Power"	Sidney Hayers	Sam Graham	9 January 1995	9
Jane and Took are assigned to protect a shipment of Luxorian Ice, a vital part of Solartek's new solar power system which offers a safe alternative to hyper fusion. Meanwhile, Brogan and Haldane investigate the death of reformed jewel thief Vella Sugoi and discover a connection that leads to a deadly struggle for control of Demeter's lucrative energy franchise.
10	"Illegal"	John Glen	Mark Scott Zicree	16 January 1995	11
Tildon Alreeuh, an illegal immigrant from Sagania, saves Brogan's life in a shooting incident, and Brogan learns that his saviour's son, Nillim, is being held by snuff fight promoter Coe Barner. With immigration officials breathing down their necks, the officers of Precinct 88 go undercover at one of Barner's bouts to rescue Nillim, but Brogan soon finds himself fighting for his life.
11	"Divided We Stand"	Alan Birkinshaw	Arthur Sellers	30 January 1995	12
Jane and Took investigate the theft of a tarn egg-sac from Demeter Memorial Hospital while Brogan and Haldane are assigned to the protection of underworld crime boss Vinny Artak, who is running for city council. When Artak is gunned down in front of them, Brogan and Haldane find themselves under investigation and learn that Vinny Artak just will not stay dead.
12	"Two Against The Rock"	Peter Duffell	Paul Robert Coyle	6 February 1995	13
Haldane and Jane escort Houdini, the most notorious escape artist on Altor, to asteroid A5 – the maximum security penitentiary known as "The Rock". But on their arrival at the asteroid, the two officers are horrified to discover that the prisoners have taken over and mass murderer Eric Volker is the new warden.
13	"Takeover"	John Glen	J. Larry Carroll & David Bennett Carren	13 February 1995	14
When Brogan and Haldane are accused of the cold blooded murder of Naxus Simi and subjected to an Internal Affairs investigation, the officers' reliability as prosecution witnesses in a case against crime boss Vanus Olverais is called into question. But Brogan and Haldane find there is far more at stake when Jane gives damning evidence against them.
14	"Predator and Prey"	Sidney Hayers	Nicholas Sagan	20 February 1995	15
Following the death of an officer from the 79th Precinct in Demeter's most fashionable nightclub, Brogan and Haldane are teamed with Lt. Verro Walker in a search for a serial killer. Walker is a loose cannon, but may hold the key to the killings when Jane discovers similarities with a string of mysterious homicides that took place nearly a hundred years before.
15	"The Witness"	Peter Duffell	Eric Gethers	24 April 1995	16
Small-time crooks are turning up dead on the streets of Demeter City and a search begins for the prime suspect Mas Maharg, spotted at the scene of the second murder by Romek's new partner Morgan. Then Fredo's daughter Estes is taken ill and Brogan realises that she has been picking up the killer's thoughts with her paramental eye.
16	"Hate Street"	Piers Haggard	Steve Brown	1 May 1995	17
An outbreak of race riots and hate crimes against Xyronite immigrants is being co-ordinated by Burl Flak, wanted for murder on Danae. Brogan and Haldane are assigned to find Flak and stop the killings, but their investigations are hampered by the appearance of Erika Brandt, a bounty hunter intent on claiming the price on Flak's head, who just happens to be one of Brogan's old flames.
17	"Friends"	Peter Duffell	Story by : Carl Jahnsen; Teleplay by : Chris Hubbell, Philip Morrow & Carl Jahnsen	8 May 1995	18
When computer hacker Reeve Pataki is taken into custody at the Precinct 88 station house, his resourceful friends in the Karel Tarik Brigade infiltrate the station's mainframe to arrange his escape. Their attempt fails, so the KTB resort to kidnapping, holding Jane hostage aboard a derelict space platform. Haldane makes this case personal because if Pataki is not released within one hour, Jane will die!
18	"Smelter Skelter"	Peter Duffell & Silvio Narizzano	Arthur Sellers	15 May 1995	19
Sally and Liz are violently threatened during an armed robbery at the Jewellery Centre and Brogan takes a personal interest in tracking down the culprits. His investigations lead him to mining operator Alvin Zann, who plans a daring raid on the orbiting Bank of Altor with a small beam accelerator – an unstoppable weapon capable of punching a hole in the very fabric of the universe!
19	"Flash"	Alan Birkinshaw	James Hendrie	29 May 1995	4
A new drug, HE-11 (also known as "Flash"), has arrived on the streets of Demeter causing spontaneous combustion in its users. While Brogan and Haldane visit Interchem, the pharmaceutical company which originally developed the drug, Orrin and Romek run into trouble when Interchem's chief chemist, Pola Vad Moonacki, is kidnapped.
20	"The Fire Within"	John Glen	Steve Brown & Burt Prelutsky	26 June 1995	21
21	"The Fire Within"	John Glen	Steve Brown & Burt Prelutsky	3 July 1995	22
Part 1: Pyrist priest Tendall Kalike dies by spontaneous combustion during a ceremony at the Pyrist Temple and the event is witnessed by Took on her first visit to the Temple as a Seeker. Brogan and Castle search for evidence that points to Kalike's death being homicide and suspicion falls on fellow priest Nevik Brok. Teamed with Podly's daughter Samina, Haldane goes undercover at the Pyrist Temple to discover the truth. Part 2: Samina disappears, Haldane resigns from the force to join the Pyrists and a power struggle among the priests leads to a third death at the Temple. Then a witness comes forward who claims that Haldane has murdered Samina, and Podly is forced to issue a warrant for Haldane's arrest as the Pyrists prepare for the Day of Immolation – the end of the world!
22	"The Forever Beetle"	Peter Duffell	Peter Dunne	10 July 1995	23
Pteronarcys Eternicum, a rare beetle capable of cell regeneration, is stolen from Dexkor Laboratories. Brogan and Haldane are assigned to the case and suspect that the theft may be an inside job. But Brogan is preoccupied with nailing drugs dealer Amory Wolf whom he believes is responsible for the death of Tommy Murphy, his oldest friend. Meanwhile, Jane and Took have a run-in with local hero Thunder Cole.
23	"Deathwatch"	Piers Haggard	Michael Berlin & Eric Estrin	17 July 1995	20
24	"Deathwatch"	Piers Haggard	Arthur Sellers	24 July 1995	24
Part 1: The arrival on Altor of a mysterious meteor fragment heralds the start of strange events at Roetem Towers on Krazucki Street where residents are being terrorised into relocation. As Jane and Took look into the disappearance of an alien farmer, Brogan and Haldane find their investigations at Roetem Towers blocked by Military Intelligence, and Brogan realises that something is going on at the apartment building that threatens all life on Altor. Part 2: After Major Graffa is possessed by the alien meteor found buried beneath Roetem Towers, Captain Weldon steals the meteor fragment that landed at Butler's farm and goes AWOL. She kidnaps Brogan to enlist his help in recovering the meteor from Graffa, but Carson learns that the meteor is a parasitic alien seed and the meteor fragment is a spore to fertilise it – bringing them together will destroy all life on Altor!

== Production ==
The series was filmed between May 1994 and April 1995 at Pinewood Studios. The special effects were filmed at Shepperton Studios.

The series was one of the highest-budgeted shows Anderson produced, and was relatively popular in Europe. However, in a repeat of the situation that UFO encountered 25 years earlier, American broadcasters were uncertain what to make of the series that seemed to be intended for young viewers, yet featured adult-oriented storylines and was usually played straight despite the bizarre storylines and make-up. As a result, Space Precinct was often scheduled in late-night or early-morning time slots. The subsequent low ratings resulted in its cancellation after just one series.

== Pilot ==
The idea for Space Precinct predated the series by nearly a decade. In 1986, Anderson and his then business partner Christopher Burr produced Space Police, a 53-minute pilot film featuring Anderson regular Shane Rimmer as Lieutenant Chuck Brogan. The pilot, which is more comedic in nature than the somewhat serious series that followed, combined live action, full-size prosthetics, puppetry, and Supermacromation techniques. It features many differences from the later series. Brogan is a much older character than that played by Shackelford, and is a bachelor. His partner – and the only other apparently human character in the pilot – is Sergeant Cathy Costello, who is revealed to be a gynoid capable of shifting between human appearance and a more robotic appearance for dangerous missions. The aliens featured in the pilot are cat-like rather than the more exotic aliens in Space Precinct. The only character other than Brogan to transfer from the pilot to the series is the robot Slo-Mo.

Production was based at Bray Film Studios and ran for 15 weeks, including eight weeks of special effects shooting. The completed film, subtitled "Star Laws", was screened at the 45th World Science Fiction Convention in 1987. In 1989, Anderson made a condensed 24-minute version in collaboration with the Moving Picture Company. Although it has never been shown on television, the pilot has been available in DVD format since 2002.

By the end of 1987, Anderson and Burr had made a deal with Harmony Gold USA to produce a series based on the pilot, but it was never developed. Jim Henson had been impressed by the pilot and offered to finance a series through his company Henson International Television (HIT), but negotiations between Anderson and Henson broke down following a management buyout of HIT in 1989. No further progress on a sale was made until 1991, when Mentorn Films took on the project and secured funding from American company Grove Television Enterprises. The BBC ordered a series of 13 episodes, but later withdrew its commission due to a reduction in its drama programming budget. "Space Police" was kept as the title until shortly before filming began in 1994, when the production companies learnt of the trademark on Lego's "Space Police" and renamed the series "Space Precinct".

=== Space Police (1986) ===
Title	Directed	Written by	Original air date	Length
"Star Laws"	Tony Bell	Gerry Anderson & Tony Barwick	Unaired	Approximately 53 minutes (24 minutes in condensed version)
Lieutenant Chuck Brogan is transferred to the Space Police after 15 years of service in the New York Police Department.

== Home media ==
Space Precinct was released on DVD in the UK, but as of 2015, is out of print. It was released on DVD in North America on 23 November 2010.

In 2017, the series was made available for streaming in the US on Amazon Prime. In November 2018, it was re-released as a DVD box set in Region 2, by Network DVD.

In 2023, the series became available to watch on BritBox in the UK. In February 2024, it was released on Peacock. In November 2024, Anderson Entertainment announced the release of a limited-edition, HD remastered Blu-ray box set for February 2025, which included a new mini-episode featuring the robot character Slo-Mo.

== See also ==
- Star Cops, an earlier TV series with a similar premise
