= Cornwall Film Festival =

The Cornwall Film Festival (Cornish: Gool Fylm Kernow) is an annual festival, first established in 2002, which focuses on supporting and celebrating the film and media industry in Cornwall, England. Aside from the annual festival, the organisation also engages with film-makers and audiences throughout the year by offering local and national premieres, and hosting masterclasses, workshops and discussions for everyone from the enthusiast to the professional.

The film festival has been recognised by a number of well-known individuals in the film industry, such as film critic Mark Kermode, who created a five-minute promotional video for the event in 2013.

The festival supports Cornish filmmaking in both the Cornish and English language and there is a "govynn kernewek" competition in which applicants present their idea for a film in the Cornish language, with the winners receiving financial, material and technical support for the production.

Many filmmakers who work solely in English will refer to themselves as Cornish filmmakers. Their films often make use of Cornish themes, landscapes and ways of life. Certainly the concept of a Cornish film industry exists, the term 'Oggywood' has been coined (from oggy meaning pasty and Hollywood). Similarly, there has been a Young People's Festival which runs a day prior to the main festival. This has run for the same amount of time as the main festival.

In 2014, a new director was appointed by the board to create a "sustainable creative vision" for the future of the festival.

The 2023 event is scheduled to take place in November in Falmouth.

== Previous Festival Dates ==
Year	Dates	Location
2017	11 & 12 November	The Poly, Falmouth
2018	9-11 November	The Poly, Falmouth
2019	15-17 November	The Poly, Falmouth
2020	13-15 November	The Poly, Falmouth
2021	15-21 November	The Poly, Falmouth
2022	14-20 November	The Poly, Falmouth

== Feature films screened ==
=== 2017 ===
- The Florida Project Dir. Sean Baker
- Even When I Fall + Q&A Dir.Sky Neal & Kate McLarnon
- The Party Dir. Sally Potter
- The Square Dir. Ruben Östlund
- Last Fisherman
- The Yukon Assignment Pro. Charlie Fripp
- Wilderness Dir. Justin Doherty
- God's Own Country Dir. Francis Lee
- Killing of a Sacred Deer Dir. Yorgos Lanthimos
- Patti Cake$ Dir. Geremy Jasper

=== 2018 ===
- PREVIEW FoxTrot Dir. Samuel Maoz
- Songbird + Q&A with Dir. Dir. Jamie Adams
- On a Knife Edge + Q&A with Dir.Dir. Jeremy Williams
- PREVIEW Colette Dir. Wash Westmoreland
- Peterloo + Q&A with Dir. Dir. Mike Leigh
- The Wife Dir.
- The Eyes of Orson Welles Dir. Mark Cousins
- The Tale Dir. Jennifer Fox
- Shoplifters Dir. Hirokazu Kore-eda
- Hannah Dir. Andrea Pallaoro
- The Wrecking Season Dir. Jane Darke (Closing Gala)

=== 2019 ===
- PREVIEW System crasher Dir Nora Fingscheidt
- Honeyland Dir Tamara Kotevska, Ljubo Stefanov
- Monos Dir Alejandro Landes
- Good Posture Dir Dolly Wells
- Little MonstersDir. Abe Forsythe
- Only You + Q&A with Director Dir. Harry Wootliff
- PREVIEW Jojo Rabbit Dir. Taika Waititi (Closing Film)
- Blues Brothers Dir. John Landis
- Hedwig and the Angry Inch Dir. John Cameron Mitchell

=== 2021 ===
- Petite Maman Dir Celina Sciama
- Titane Dir Julia Ducournau
- Spencer Dir Pablo Larraín
- Ali and Ava Dir Clio Barnard
- Bad Luck Banging Or Loony Porn Dir Radu Jude
- The Card Counter Dir Paul Schrader
- Memory Box Dir Joana nHadjithomas, Khalil Joerige
- Lamb Dir Valdimar Jóhannsson

== Awards ==
2005 Delabole Slate Audience Award Film of the Festival: Encounters, Dir: Pat Kelman Prod.: Jonty Reason on behalf of Pittot Films

2005 Delabole Slate Audience Award Student Film of the Festival: Sunday Bench, Dir: Russell Hancock

2005 Govynn Kernewek Award: Tap Tap Tap, Dir: Marie Foulston

2019

Fellowship Awards: Rory Wilton (Actor)

Golden Chough:Mark Jenkin (Director)for Bait (2019 film)

Music Video Award: JERUSALEM (Ofer Winter, Shimon Engel)

Best Short Award: FUNFAIR (Dir. Kaveh Mazaheri)

Best Regional Short: YN Mor (Dir. Zoe Alker)

Sub Awards:

Best Scriptwriting (supported by The Writers Collective) THE SEA Written by Cameron Richards

Highly Commended for Writing: FLYING LESSONS Written, produced and directed by Laurence Donoghue

Best Actor (Supported by WeAudition): Anna Friel: The Sea

Best Ensemble Cast: 'Yn Mor'

== See also ==
- Culture of Cornwall
- List of topics related to Cornwall
- Falmouth, Cornwall
