= Bait (2019 film) =

British drama film by Mark Jenkin

- Theatrical release poster
- Directed by: Mark Jenkin
- Written by: Mark Jenkin
- Produced by: Kate Byers; Linn Waite
- Starring: Edward Rowe; Mary Woodvine; Simon Shepherd; Giles King
- Cinematography: Mark Jenkin
- Edited by: Mark Jenkin
- Music by: Mark Jenkin
- Production company: Early Day Films
- Distributed by: BFI Films
- Release date: 30 August 2019
- Running time: 89 minutes
- Country: United Kingdom
- Language: English
- Box office: $1.5 million

Bait is a 2019 British drama film written, directed, shot, edited, and scored by Mark Jenkin. It stars Edward Rowe as a struggling fisherman in a Cornish fishing village, and deals with rising tensions between the locals and tourists. Set against a backdrop of second homes, short-term lets, and gentrification, it has been interpreted as a critique of precarity.

== Plot ==
Brothers Steven and Martin Ward live in a Cornish fishing village whose economy has become increasingly reliant on tourism. Steven has inherited their late father’s fishing boat and uses it to take tourists on boat trips, a point of contention with Martin, who struggles to maintain a traditional way of life fishing and selling his catch door-to-door without a boat. Martin resents the tourist presence in the town and their impositions on the local way of life, including complaining about the noise the fishermen make in the morning and causing the local pub to close during the winter off-season. Steven's son Neil prefers to fish with his uncle rather than accompany his father on boat tours.

The brothers have sold their childhood home to Tim and Sandra Leigh, a well-to-do couple from out of town who rent the home to vacationers. Martin has a contentious relationship with the Leighs, offended by the renovations they have made to the home, including removing their mother's pantry and installing twee nautical-themed decor that Martin sees as a mockery of the village’s traditional fishing ways. Tensions come to a head when Martin’s truck is booted when he parks in front of the family home. He tries to remove the boot with help from Wenna, a free-spirited barmaid at the pub, but when Tim confronts them, Wenna physically assaults him and spends the night in jail.

On advice from a mysterious, ghostly fisherman who appears periodically throughout the film, Martin tries fishing for lobster in a local gully. He succeeds, but his catch is stolen by the Leighs' son Hugo, who brings the lobster home for his family to eat. Later that night, Martin confronts Hugo at the pub and makes him mend the cut lobster trap in front of all the other patrons. A guilty Sandra comes to Martin’s home and discovers the tin in which he keeps his savings to buy his boat. She slips money into his savings tin.

Neil begins a relationship with the Leighs' daughter Katie, which Hugo discovers when they confront him for stealing Martin's lobster traps. When Hugo insults his sister for her relationship with Neil, Neil attacks him, leading to a physical confrontation that ends in Neil accidentally falling to his death on the docks below. Following the tragedy and after seeing what the Leighs have done to the family home, Steven returns to fishing with Martin and Wenna as his crew. As they set out to sea, Martin sees Neil’s spirit looking on.

== Cast ==
- Edward Rowe as Martin Ward
- Mary Woodvine as Sandra Leigh
- Isaac Woodvine as Neil Ward
- Chloe Endean as Wenna Kowalski
- Simon Shepherd as Tim Leigh
- Georgia Ellery as Katie Leigh
- Giles King as Steven Ward
- Stacey Guthrie as Liz Stewart
- Jowan Jacobs as Hugo Leigh

== Production ==
Jenkin filmed Bait using a vintage hand-cranked Bolex camera, using 16mm monochrome film that he hand processed. Shooting locations include Charlestown and West Penwith, in Cornwall.

== Reception ==
=== Critical reception ===
On Rotten Tomatoes, the film holds an approval rating of 100% based on 39 reviews, with an average score of 8.5/10. The site's critical consensus reads: "As visually distinctive as it is narratively satisfying, Bait blends a classic aesthetic with timely themes to produce a thrillingly original and uniquely enriching drama." On Metacritic, the film has a weighted average score of 84 out of 100, based on 8 critics, indicating "universal acclaim".

Writing in The Observer, Mark Kermode gave a glowing review, describing the film as 'a genuine modern masterpiece, which establishes Jenkin as one of the most arresting and intriguing British film-makers of his generation.' He later named Bait his favourite film of both the year and the decade. Peter Bradshaw in The Guardian called the film 'intriguing and unexpectedly watchable', in a four-star review that remarked on the experimental nature of the film.

=== Accolades ===
Year	Festival or Institution	Category	Nominees	Result	Ref.
2019	British Independent Film Awards	Best Director	Mark Jenkin	Nominated	
2019	British Independent Film Awards	Best British Independent Film	Mark Jenkin, Kate Byers, Linn Waite	Nominated	
2019	British Independent Film Awards	Breakthrough Producer	Kate Byers, Linn Waite	Won	
2019	British Independent Film Awards	Best Editing	Mark Jenkin	Nominated	
2019	Edinburgh International Film Festival	Michael Powell Award for Best British Feature Film	Mark Jenkin	Nominated	
2019	Galway Film Fleadh	Best International Film	Mark Jenkin	Nominated	
2019	IndieLisboa International Independent Film Festival	Audience Award for Best Feature Film	Mark Jenkin	Won	
2019	IndieLisboa International Independent Film Festival	International Competition - Grand Prize City of Lisbon	Mark Jenkin	Nominated	
2019	Istanbul International Film Festival	Golden Tulip Award	Mark Jenkin	Nominated	
2019	Montreal Festival of New Cinema	Prix de l'expérimentation	Mark Jenkin	Nominated	
2019	Stockholm International Film Festival	Best Director	Mark Jenkin	Won	
2019	Stockholm International Film Festival	Best Film	Mark Jenkin	Nominated	
2019	New Horizons Film Festival	Audience Award for Best Film	Mark Jenkin	Won	
2019	New Horizons Film Festival	Grand Prix	Mark Jenkin	Won	
2019	British Academy Film Awards	Outstanding British Film	Mark Jenkin, Kate Byers, and Linn Waite	Nominated	
2019	British Academy Film Awards	Outstanding Debut by a British Writer, Director or Producer	Mark Jenkin (Writer/Director); Kate Byers, Linn Waite (Producers)	Won	
2020	Crested Butte Film Festival	Best Narrative Feature	Mark Jenkin	Won	
