= Meg Leonard =

British screenwriter, producer and director

- Occupation: Screenwriter, film director and producer
- Years active: 2004–present
- Partner: Nick Moorcroft
- Children: 3

Meg Leonard is a screenwriter, producer and director.

== Career ==
Meg Leonard, also known as Meg Mistry, spent ten years working in Casting for film, television and theatre before embarking on a career as a screenwriter, producer and director. During this period she produced the short film “Ten Minute Movie” starring John Simm and Jimi Mistry which won the Special Jury Award at Houston Film Festival and was nominated for Best Short Film at the Belfast Film Festival.

In 2018 and 2019, she co-wrote and produced two of the most successful Independent British films of the last decade; Fisherman's Friends, about a group of Cornish fishermen from Port Isaac who were signed by Universal Records and achieved a top 10 hit with their debut album of traditional sea shanties and Finding Your Feet which starred Bafta award-winning and Oscar nominated actress, Imelda Staunton and Timothy Spall. The film opened the 35th Torino Film Festival and won the Audience Award for Best Film at the Palm Springs International Film Festival in 2018.

A French remake of Finding Your Feet based on her original screenplay co-written with Nick Moorcroft started shooting in Paris, France, on 10 August 2020. The film, entitled "Alors On Danse" was directed, adapted by and stars Michèle Laroque and will be theatrically released by UGC nationwide in France on 22 January 2022. The film features an all-star French cast including Thierry Lhermitte, Isabelle Nanty and Jean-Hugues Anglade.

On 22 September 2020, it was announced that Leonard and her partners Nick Moorcroft and James Spring had purchased the film rights to produce a biopic about British hero Captain Tom Moore who raised over £40 Million for the NHS throughout the COVID-19 pandemic. The film is due to go into production in 2021 with a 2022 global theatrical release date.

On 11 March 2021, Flying Fish Productions, a new film company founded by Leonard, Nick Moorcroft and James Spring, signed a 3 year distribution deal with Entertainment Film Distributors.

On 7 April 2021, she co-wrote, co-directed and executive produced Fisherman's Friends: One and All, the sequel to Fisherman's Friends. Principal photography on the film started on 7 April 2021 on location in Port Isaac, Cornwall and London for six weeks. The film stars James Purefoy, David Hayman, Dave Johns, Sam Swainsbury, Maggie Steed, Jade Anouka, Ramon Tikaram and Irish singer-songwriter Imelda May making her acting debut.

== Filmography (Screenwriter) ==
- Finding Your Feet
- Fisherman's Friends
- Blithe Spirit (2020 film)
- Fisherman's Friends: One and All

== Filmography (Producer) ==
- Urban Hymn Executive Producer
- Finding Your Feet Producer
- Fisherman's Friends Produced By
- The Corrupted Executive Producer
- Blithe Spirit (2020 film)Produced By
- Fisherman's Friends: One and All

== Filmography (Director) ==
- Fisherman's Friends: One and All
