= Nick Moorcroft =

English screenwriter (born 1978)

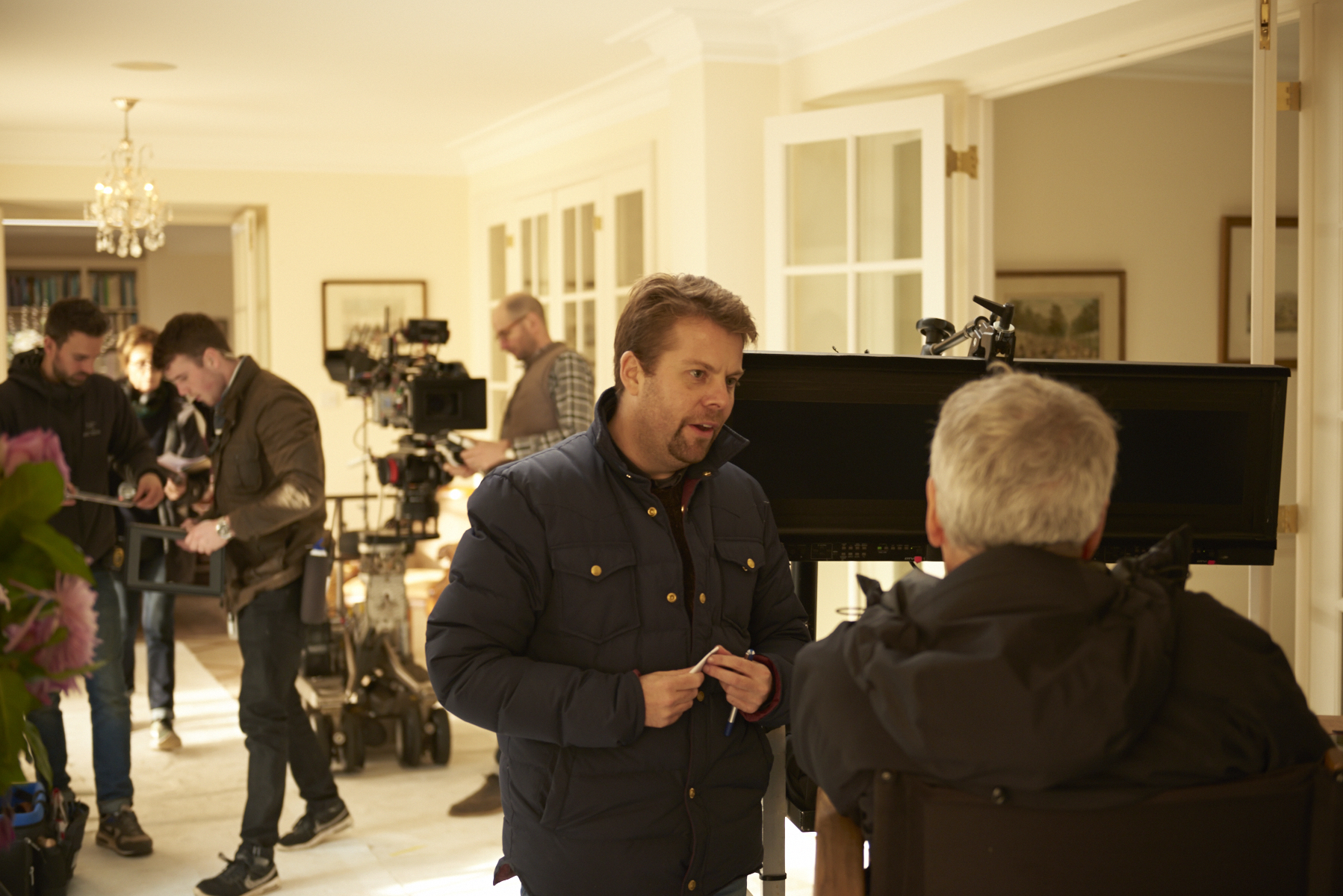
- Moorcroft on the set of Finding Your Feet
- Born: 22 December 1978 (age 47); Chelmsford, Essex, England, U.K.
- Occupations: Writer, Director, Producer, Actor
- Children: 3
- Writing career
- Years active: 2002–present

Nick Moorcroft (born 22 December 1978) is a British screenwriter, director, and producer.

== Early life ==
Moorcroft was born in 1978 in Chelmsford, Essex. He was expelled from school and diagnosed with ADHD at a young age, as well as being arrested multiple times. At a court ordered attendance centre, he discovered acting. He was offered a place at one of the country's leading drama schools - Webber Douglas Academy of Dramatic Art - when he was 18 after his mother encouraged him to audition. Unable to afford the tuition fees, he won an Essex County Council Scholarship and went on to study at the prestigious acting academy in South Kensington, London, which he left after one term in December 1997 before producing and acting in a fringe theatre production in November 1998 called The Gary Oldman Fanclub at The Man in The Moon on Kings Road. The play was directed by award-winning playwright and screenwriter Barrie Keeffe and written by Jonathan Stratford. Keeffe became a creative mentor to Moorcroft and encouraged him to give up acting and focus on writing full time which led to him embarking on a career as a screenwriter, producer and director.

== Career ==
=== Film ===
In 2004 he sold his first spec script to Barnaby Thompson's Fragile Films. The period comedy, called Burke & Hare, is about two Irish serial killers who sold the corpses of their 17 victims to the Edinburgh Medical College for dissection. In Variety, an entertainment industry newspaper, the article "The 'Brit List' circulates British film community" by film journalist Adam Dawtrey, reported that the screenplay was included on the Brit List: 2007, which lists the most liked and recommended unproduced screenplays in the UK and Ireland.

In 2006 Moorcroft wrote the screenplay for St Trinian's, a film based on the cartoons by British cartoonist, Ronald Searle, for Ealing Studios. It was reported in Screen International that the schoolgirl comedy, based on the cartoons by Ronald Searle, had a budget of $13m (£6.5m) and took $26m (£13m) at the UK box office alone, making it the then third most successful independent British film, behind Four Weddings and a Funeral and Trainspotting.

Moorcroft co-wrote the 2009 sequel, St Trinian's: The Legend of Fritton's Gold with Piers Ashworth. It opened at No. 2 in the UK just behind Avatar with debut week end box office figures of £1,586,832.[4] As of 10 February 2010, the film has grossed a total of £7,019,714, which is lower than the first installment's £12,280,529. It was the fourth biggest hit of the Christmas season behind Alvin and the Chipmunks: The Squeakquel, Sherlock Holmes, and Avatar.

Burke & Hare started shooting on 28 January 2010. The film was directed by American filmmaker John Landis and starred Simon Pegg and Andy Serkis as the murderous duo. Filming took place around Edinburgh with some scenes also being shot in Stirling and London and Ealing Studios. It was released on 29 October 2010.

On 31 April 2010, Barnaby Thompson, head of Ealing Studios and Fragile Films, announced to the British press that screenwriters Nick Moorcroft and Piers Ashworth were to write a film comedy about Fisherman's Friends. The true story is about a group of Cornish singing fisherman from Port Isaac in Cornwall, England who signed a £1 million record deal with Universal Records and saw their album of sea shanties debut at number nine in the British pop album charts, creating history as the first-ever folk album to reach such a position.

The Los Angeles Times reported on 6 July 2010 that Hollywood Studio, Columbia Pictures, had hired writers Piers Ashworth and Nick Moorcroft to write a script for the family adventure story Christian the lion.

The true story about John Rendall and Ace Bourke, who bought a lion cub at Harrods department store in 1969, became an internet sensation in 2008 when a heart-warming clip appeared on YouTube of Christian the lion recognizing his former owners in the wilds of Africa after they had raised it as their own in their London flat on the Kings Road then arranged for him to be returned to Kenya and reintroduced into the wild by George Adamson. The clip has been viewed more than 14 million times. The adventure story will be produced by Hollywood mega-producer Neal Moritz who is behind the films The Fast and the Furious and I Am Legend.

On 2 July 2014 The Hollywood Reporter announced that Michael Caton-Jones would direct Urban Hymn, a film written by Nick Moorcroft. Principal photography started on 22 September 2014 in London. The film is a coming-of-age drama set against the backdrop of the 2011 English riots and stars Shirley Henderson, Ian Hart, Letitia Wright, Isabella Laughland and English musician and activist, Billy Bragg. The film was selected for the 2015 Toronto International Film Festival in September, where it received its world premiere in the 'City To City' section to favourable reviews. The film opened in select cinemas in America on 12 May 2017. It was the New York Times pick of the week.

On 14 May 2016, Variety announced at the Cannes Film Festival that Bafta award-winning and Oscar-nominated actress, Imelda Staunton, would star in Finding Your Feet, a film written by Nick Moorcroft & Meg Leonard and directed by Richard Loncraine Screen International reported at the Toronto Film Festival that Timothy Spall, Celia Imrie, Joanna Lumley, David Hayman, John Sessions and Josie Lawrence had joined the project. Filming started on 31 October 2016, in London and Rome. The film was released in Australia on 26 December 2017 then nationwide in the United Kingdom on 23 February 2018. Roadside Attractions picked up U.S. distribution rights and released the film in America. The film performed incredibly well in the U.K and Australia and was one of the highest grossing independent British films of the last five years and marked Moorcroft's most successful film since St Trinian's.

On 13 October 2017, The Hollywood Reporter announced that Nick Moorcroft and Meg Leonard had been hired to adapt The Lido – the highly anticipated debut novel from Libby Page. The book sold to Orion in the U.K. and to Simon & Schuster in the U.S. within 24 hours of submission. The novel has now been sold to more than 24 territories around the world. Catalyst CEO Charlotte Walls will produce the feature-film adaptation.

In a Variety exclusive on 16 March 2018, it was reported that The Corrupted had commenced shooting in London, United Kingdom. The film is directed by Ron Scalpello from an original screenplay written by Nick Moorcroft. It stars Sam Claflin, Timothy Spall, Noel Clarke, Hugh Bonneville and David Hayman and was distributed in the U.K by Entertainment Film Distributors in 2019.

Filming commenced on Fisherman's Friends on 30 April 2018 on location in Port Isaac, Cornwall and London for five weeks. All members of the band have cameos in the film and worked as consultants on the film. The film was a box office hit in the UK and was released on 503 screens on 15 March 2019 and debuted at No. 2 in the UK Box office chart, grossing $1,534,908 in its opening weekend behind global box office phenomenon Captain Marvel. The film was No. 3 in its second week end, taking $1,285,332. The film was No. 4 in its third week end, taking $820,293. As of Friday 19 May 2021, the film had grossed $12,553,041.

A French remake of Finding Your Feet, based on the original screenplay written by Nick Moorcroft & Meg Leonard, started shooting in Paris, France, on 10 August 2020. The film, entitled "Alors on Danse" was directed, adapted by and stars Michèle Laroque and was theatrically released by UGC nationwide in France on 22 January 2022. The film featured an all-star French cast including Thierry Lhermitte, Isabelle Nanty and Jean-Hugues Anglade.

On 11 March 2021, Flying Fish Productions, a new film company founded by Moorcroft, Meg Leonard and James Spring, signed a 3-year distribution deal with Entertainment Film Distributors.

On 7 April 2021, Moorcroft co-wrote, co-directed and executive produced Fisherman's Friends: One and All, the sequel to Fisherman's Friends with his partner, Meg Leonard. Principal photography on the film started on 7 April 2021 on location in Port Isaac, Cornwall and London for six weeks. The film starred James Purefoy, David Hayman, Dave Johns, Sam Swainsbury, Maggie Steed, Jade Anouka, Ramon Tikaram and Irish singer-songwriter Imelda May making her acting debut.

As of September 2025, Moorcroft is working on a film about autistic youth boxer Billy Long Jr. and his father, who opened a boxing gym to help disaffected young people in Chelmsford.

=== Theatre ===
Fisherman's Friends: The Musical had its world premiere at Truro's Hall For Cornwall on 13 Oct 2021 and ran for three weeks until 30 Oct 2021. Based on the true story of the chart-topping Cornish singing sensations and their hit 2019 film, Fisherman's Friends: The Musical is a feel-good voyage about friendship, community and music that will give any land-lover a mighty pair of sea legs. The production was a huge success and smashed box-office records at Cornwalls oldest and largest theatre. Following its sell-out run a 2022 and 2023 National Tour of the UK and Ireland was announced on 5 November 2021. The production was directed by James Grieve (former Joint Artistic Director of Paines Plough and former associate director of the Bush Theatre and written by Amanda Whittington. It is designed by Lucy Osborne with musical supervision from David White.

== Filmography ==
=== Screenwriter ===
- St Trinian's (2006)
- St Trinian's: The Legend of Fritton's Gold (2009)
- Burke & Hare (2010)
- Urban Hymn (2015)
- Finding Your Feet (2018)
- Fisherman's Friends (2019)
- The Corrupted (2019)
- Blithe Spirit (2020)
- Fisherman's Friends: One and All (2022)
- Mother's Pride (film) (2026)

=== Producer ===
- Urban Hymn Executive Producer
- Finding Your Feet Producer
- Fisherman's Friends Produced By
- The Corrupted Executive Producer
- Blithe Spirit Produced By
- Fisherman's Friends: One and All Executive Producer
- Mother's Pride (film) Executive Producer

=== Director ===
- Fisherman's Friends: One and All
- Mother's Pride (film)
