= Mother's Pride (film) =

2026 British film by Nick Moorcroft

- Theatrical release poster
- Directed by: Nick Moorcroft
- Screenplay by: Meg Leonard; Nick Moorcroft
- Produced by: James Spring
- Starring: Jonno Davies; Martin Clunes; James Buckley
- Cinematography: Toby Moore
- Edited by: Johnny Dalkes
- Music by: Simon Boswell
- Production companies: Circus Studios; Media Finance Capital; Foundry; Principal Film Finance; Flying Fish Productions; Fred Films; Powder Keg Pictures; Twickenham Film Studios; Globe Productions; Omeira Studio Partners
- Distributed by: Entertainment Film Distributors
- Release date: 6 March 2026
- Running time: 93 minutes
- Country: United Kingdom
- Language: English

Mother's Pride is a 2026 comedy-drama film directed by Nick Moorcroft. The film stars Martin Clunes, James Buckley, Jonno Davies, Mark Addy and Gabriella Wilde.

== Plot ==
Cal Harley, a bankrupt musician, returns from the United States to his home village of Birchbury, Somerset, after the death of his mother. He moves back in with his father, Mick, and brother, Jake, who run the Drovers Arms pub, and are initially resentful towards him for being absent from the family for several years. Cal learns that the pub is facing financial difficulties and is at risk of being repossessed due to poor reviews and competition from an adjacent establishment owned by businessman Edward Pritchard, who operates a chain of pubs.

Inspired by memories of learning to brew ale with his grandfather, Cal decides to create a new beer and enter it into the CAMRA Regional Tastings, hoping to win enough recognition to save the Drovers Arms. He reconnects with his former girlfriend, Abi, who is now in a relationship with Pritchard. He reveals to her that the love songs he wrote during his music career where inspired by her, prompting her to kindle her feelings for him.

Cal's first attempt at brewing is unsuccessful, so Jake attempts to use Cal's celebrity status to attract customers to the Drovers Arms. The pub is overwhelmed with fans of Cal, which causes him to suffer a panic attack during which he admits that he'd previously been sectioned, the reason he'd missed his mother's funeral which was one of the causes of the rift with his family. They reconcile, and with support from Mick, Jake, and Jake's daughter, Romy, Cal makes another attempt at brewing using locally-sourced spring water and honey produced by Jake's bees. Pritchard offers to purchase the Drovers Arms, but insults the Harley family during negotiations. Mick assaults him and is charged with actual bodily harm.

The second brew qualifies for the CAMRA Finals in London, alongside Pritchard's own beer. Following Mick's court hearing, the family take Cal's mother's ashes to be scattered on a hilltop and return to the pub to discover it has been burgled and their brewing equipment has been destroyed. Mick suffers a stress-induced heart attack and is hospitalized. Cal learns that their supplier, Harry, carried out the sabotage after being paid to do so by Pritchard out of jealousy. Abi ends her relationship with him and leaves him for Cal.

With Pritchard's involvement in the sabotage exposed, the residents of Birchbury rally behind the Drovers Arms and begin raising money to replace the destroyed brewery equipment. The fundraising expands onto social media with a crowdfunding campaign, and the Drovers Arms attracts support from outside the village. While Mick recovers in hospital, Romy suggests the name "Mother's Pride" for the beer.

Cal and Jake travel to London for the CAMRA Finals in a horse-drawn carriage, documenting their journey on social media to gain further support. They arrive late and are almost disqualified, however Mother's Pride ultimate wins the Beer of Britain award, securing national recognition for the Drovers Arms.

Following their victory, the Drovers Arms are offered investment that would allow the pub to expand, but they decline in order to keep the business locally owned. With the continued support of the people of Birchbury, the Drovers Arms is able to remain open.

== Cast ==
- Jonno Davies as Cal Harley, a famous musician.
- Martin Clunes as Mick Harley, Cal's father and the owner of the Drovers Arms pub.
- James Buckley as Jake Harley, Cal's brother who works at the Drovers Arms.
- Gabriella Wilde as Abi Stockton, Cal's former girlfriend and Romy's teacher.
- Mark Addy as Paxman, a regular at the Drovers Arms.
- Lana Moorcroft as Romy Harley, Jake's daughter who attends primary school.
- Luke Treadaway as Edward Pritchard, the owner of the Pritchard's Pubs chain.
- Miles Jupp as Jeremy Andrews
- Lola-Rose Maxwell as Dawn Higgins
- Josie Lawrence as Edith Higgins
- Karl Collins as Wilf
- Emily Lloyd-Saini as Amy Dewsbury
- Stephen Leask as Harry
- Richard Glover as Jim the Policeman
- Jack Loy as David Schumer the Investor

== Production ==
The film is directed by Nick Moorcroft, who co-wrote the screenplay with Meg Leonard. The film is produced by James Spring and was announced in 2022. The film is produced by Fred Films.

The cast is led by Jonno Davies, Martin Clunes and James Buckley, and also includes Gabriella Wilde, Mark Addy, Lana Moorcroft, Luke Treadaway, Miles Jupp, Lola-Rose Maxwell, Josie Lawrence, Karl Collins and Emily Lloyd-Saini.

Principal photography took place in Bristol, Somerset and Wiltshire in the summer of 2024. Filming locations included The George Inn and the Fleur De Lys in Norton St Philip.

== Release ==
The film was released on 6 March 2026 by EFD, after being delayed from a previously announced release in May 2025.

The film opened in UK cinemas on 515 screens and took £707,534 on its opening weekend, ranking it #5 in the UK top 20 box office chart. This marked the biggest debut of 2026 for a British film with the UK as its primary production territory, ahead of the likes of Giant (£357,714), Wasteman (£279,592) and H Is For Hawk (£242,952).
