= Fisherman's Friends: One and All =

British film by Nick Moorcroft and Meg Leonard

- Teaser poster
- Directed by: Nick Moorcroft; Meg Leonard
- Written by: Nick Moorcroft; Meg Leonard; Piers Ashworth
- Produced by: Nick Moorcroft; Meg Leonard; James Spring
- Starring: James Purefoy; Imelda May; David Hayman; Dave Johns; Jade Anouka; Ramon Tikaram; Fiona Button; Sam Swainsbury; Richard Harrington; Maggie Steed
- Cinematography: Toby Moore
- Edited by: Johnny Daukes
- Music by: Rupert Christie
- Production companies: Head Gear Films; Powder Keg Pictures; Fred Films; Legacy
- Distributed by: Entertainment Film Distributors
- Release date: 19 August 2022 (United Kingdom)
- Running time: 112 minutes
- Country: United Kingdom
- Language: English

Fisherman's Friends: One and All is a 2022 British film directed by Nick Moorcroft and Meg Leonard from a screenplay by Moorcroft, Leonard and Piers Ashworth. The film stars James Purefoy, David Hayman, Richard Harrington, Dave Johns, Sam Swainsbury, Maggie Steed, Jade Anouka and Ramon Tikaram, with Irish singer-songwriter Imelda May making her acting debut. The sequel to the 2019 film Fisherman's Friends, the film follows the continued career of Fisherman's Friends up to their performance at the Glastonbury Festival in 2011.

== Production ==
Principal photography on the film started on 7 April 2021 on location in Port Isaac, Cornwall and London for six weeks.

== Reception ==
On the review aggregator website Rotten Tomatoes, 33% of 12 critics' reviews are positive, with an average rating of 4.7/10.
