= Christian Brassington =

British actor (born 1983)

- Born: 6 June 1983 (age 42); Wellington, Shropshire, England
- Education: Webber Douglas Academy of Dramatic Art
- Occupations: Actor; writer
- Years active: 2006–present
- Spouse: Jennie Fava (m. 2013)

Christian Brassington (born 6 June 1983) is an English actor and writer, best known for playing the odious vicar Ossie Whitworth in the third and fourth series of the BBC hit period drama Poldark. Brassington also portrayed a young Boris Johnson in the More4 documentary drama When Boris Met Dave (2009), having previously played a young Tony Blair for Channel 4 in 2006.

== Early life and education ==
Brassington was born on 6 June 1983 in Wellington, Shropshire, England. He spent much of his youth in Basingstoke, going to the local comprehensive Brighton Hill Community School and then to Queen Mary's College. He also attended a stage school run by his father Colin Flaherty. Determined to become an actor, he studied at London's prestigious Webber Douglas Academy of Dramatic Art.

== Career ==
He made his on-screen debut in the BBC's police procedural drama The Cops back in 1999 and got his big break shortly after graduation in Tony Blair: Rock Star (2006), a Channel 4 docudrama recreating the days when the former British Prime Minister Tony Blair's ambition was to be on stage. A year later, the young Brassington starred opposite Cate Blanchett as Charles II, Archduke of Austria in Elizabeth: The Golden Age (2007), and in 2009 he followed up his part as Blair with a portrayal of the then Foreign Secretary Boris Johnson as a younger man in When Boris Met Dave, an account of how Johnson and David Cameron's lives became intertwined.

Brassington welcomes all kinds of roles as long as they are interesting and challenging. In an interview with PBS, he said, "I think you get yourself into trouble if you start thinking about what people's reactions are going to be while you're playing them". His portrayal of the loathsome Reverend Ossie Whitworth in the third and fourth series of the BBC historical drama Poldark (2015–2019) is possibly one of his most recognisable roles. In order to prepare for the part, he had to gain 30 pounds. According to Digital Spy, he said, "Normally actors have to get into shape for a role rather than out of it, but Osborne is described as a large character and a man of a huge appetite, so there was no getting around that. I had to gain a lot of weight."

In 2020, Brassington made his debut as a screenwriter and director with a short film called Screening, starring David Tennant, Georgia Tennant and Stephen Mangan. He also has written Doctor Who audio dramas "Neon Reign" (2018) and "Altered Status" (2021) for Big Finish Productions.

In 2022, he appeared as prison officer Dean in Catherine Tate's six-part mockumentary sitcom Hard Cell, released on Netflix.

== Filmography ==
=== Film ===
Year	Title	Role	Notes
2006	Tony Blair: Rock Star	Tony Blair	Television film documentary
2006	Incubus	Peter	
2007	Web of Deceit	Tom Gunner	
2007	Mrs. Ratcliffe's Revolution	Thomas	
2007	Elizabeth: The Golden Age	Archduke Charles	
2008	The German	The German	Short film
2008	Easy Virtue	Phillip Hurst	
2008	A Woman in Love and War: Vera Brittain	Roland Leighton	Television film documentary
2009	When Boris Met Dave	Boris Johnson	Television film documentary
2009	Princess Kaiulani	Duke	
2009	St Trinian's 2: The Legend of Fritton's Gold	Peters	
2010	Burke and Hare	Charles	
2011	In Love with Alma Cogan	George	
2012	Doubt on Loan	Nic	Television film
2012	The Carrion Crow	The Stranger	Short film
2013	Hummingbird	Max Forrester	Released as Redemption in the USA
2013	The Body	Alan	Short film
2013	The Five(ish) Doctors Reboot	Editor	Television film
2014	The Smoke	Tom	
2015	96 Ways to Say I Love You	Harry	Short film
2016	Our Kind of Traitor	Secretary to the Cabinet	
2016	The Exit	Brian	Short film
2016	Patient Seven	Alan	Segment: "The Body"
2016	Cocaine Conspiracy	Marcus	Video
2017	You, Me and Him	Dave	
2018	Wild Geese	Spencer	Short film
2019	Fisherman's Friends	Henry	
2020	Screening	None	Short film; director and writer
2021	Jolt	Reception Clerk (Julian)	
2021	The Last Letter from Your Lover	Dominic	

=== Television ===
Year	Title	Role	Notes
1999	The Cops	Gregor	Episode #2.7
2008	The Bill	Darren Smart	Episode: "Fools Rush In"
2009	Land Girls	Cpl. Cal Gillespie	Episodes: "Childhood's End" and "Secrets"
2010	Little Crackers	Joe	Episode: "Bill Bailey's Little Cracker: Car Park Babylon"
2014–2015	Suspects	Newsreader	10 episodes
2015	Life in Squares	Cuthbert	Episode #1.1
2017–2018	Poldark	Reverend Osborne 'Ossie' Whitworth	11 episodes
2019	Hold the Sunset	Percy	Episode: "The Sale"
2020	Semi-Detached	Humphrey	3 episodes
2022	The Pact	Jan	6 episodes
2022	Hard Cell	Dean	6 episodes
