= The George Aloe and the Sweepstake =

Traditional song

"The George Aloe and the Sweepstake" (Roud 6739, Child 285) is a traditional folk song. In 1595, a ballad was entered into the Stationers' Register with the note that it was to be sung to the tune of The George Aloe and the Sweepstake. The ballad tells of the battles with a pirate ship. Several variations of the ballad exist.

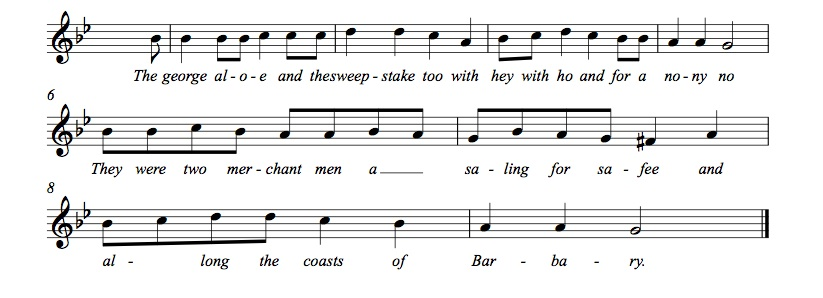

== Synopsis ==
The George Aloe and the Sweepstake were merchant ships bound for Safee. The George Aloe took anchor, while the Sweepstake went ahead. and, after an exchange of hails, was taken by a French man-o-war. The George Aloe received the news, followed, exchanged the same hails, and defeated the ship.

The American variant The Coast of High Barbaree includes only one ship, which exchanges hails with a Barbary pirate and defeats it, as the George Aloe does with the French ship.

== See also ==
- List of the Child Ballads
