= The Corrupted =

2019 film by Ron Scalpello

- Theatrical release poster
- Directed by: Ron Scalpello
- Written by: Nick Moorcroft
- Produced by: Andrew Berg; John Sachs; Nik Bowers; Laure Vaysse
- Starring: Sam Claflin; Timothy Spall; Noel Clarke; David Hayman; Charlie Murphy; Naomi Ackie; Joe Claflin; Sam Otto; Cathal Pendred; Hugh Bonneville
- Cinematography: Richard Mott
- Edited by: Peter Christelis
- Music by: Andrew Kawczynski
- Production companies: Eclipse Films; REP Crime; Riverstone Pictures; The Exchange; Powderkeg Pictures; Fred Films; Head Gear Films; Metrol Technology; Kreo Films
- Distributed by: Entertainment Film Distributors
- Release date: 10 May 2019 (United Kingdom)
- Running time: 103 minutes
- Country: United Kingdom
- Language: English
- Box office: $177,100

The Corrupted is a 2019 British crime thriller film directed by Ron Scalpello from a screenplay by Nick Moorcroft. The film stars Sam Claflin, Timothy Spall, Noel Clarke, David Hayman, Charlie Murphy, Naomi Ackie, Joe Claflin, Sam Otto, Cathal Pendred and Hugh Bonneville, and follows an ex-convict who tries to win back the trust of his family after losing everything to a local crime syndicate.

== Cast ==
- Sam Claflin as Liam McDonagh, an ex-convict
  - Jack Veal as young Liam
- Timothy Spall as Clifford Cullen, the leader of a local crime syndicate
- Hugh Bonneville as Anthony Hammond
- Cathal Pendred as Gerry Dwyer
- Shaun Dooley as Eamonn
- Charlie Murphy as DC Gemma Connelly
- Noel Clarke as DS Neil Beckett
- David Hayman as DCI Raymond Ellery
- Lorraine Ashbourne as Pam Cullen, wife of Clifford Cullen
- Adam Long as Warren Byford
- Joe Claflin as Sean McDonagh
- Naomi Ackie as Grace, Liam's wife
- Aled Arhyel as Archie, Liam's son
- George Russo as DI Frank Walsh
- Don Gilet as DI Graham Patterson
- Alec McKenna as Isaac Gale
- Decca Heggie as Jonjo Dixon
- Sam Otto as Nayan Khaliq
- Linal Haft as Albert Grimes
- Silas Carson as Mayor Ahmad
- Kirsty Hoiles as probation officer
- Jo Dyson as Mrs Byford
- Simon Chandler as Andrew Reid, Dy Asst Commissioner
- Nya Summer as Jodie Connelly
- Andrei Satalov as Besmir Rugova

== Production ==
=== Development ===
On 20 June 2017, Eclipse Global Entertainment announced Ron Scalpello as director on their website.

=== Casting ===
On 5 February 2018, it was announced that Sam Claflin had joined the cast alongside Timothy Spall. Hugh Bonneville, David Hayman and Naomi Ackie were also added. On 16 March 2018, Noel Clarke was cast as a police detective.

=== Filming ===
Principal photography commenced on 16 March 2018 in various locations around London. Some filming took place on the Dartford area of the North Kent Marshes in Kent as the setting of a crime scene.

== Release ==
The film was released theatrically in the United Kingdom on 10 May 2019 by Entertainment Film Distributors.
