= Coast of High Barbaree =

Song

The "Coast of High Barbary" is a traditional song (Roud 134) which was popular among British and American sailors. It is most frequently sung as a ballad but can also be a sea shanty. It tells of a sailing ship that came across a pirate ship off the Barbary Coast and defeated the pirates, who were left to drown.

An earlier version of the ballad is found in the Stationers’ Register for January 14, 1595 and tells the story of two merchant ships, the George Aloe and the Sweepstake, both sailing to Safee. While the George Aloe was resting at anchor, the Sweepstake sailed on, but a French ship attacked the Sweepstake and threw the crew overboard. The George Aloe gave chase and defeated the French ship, whose crew were shown no mercy because of the fate of the crew of the Sweepstake.

The most common lyrics may refer to the problems European and North American traders had with the North African pirates in the second half of the 18th century and the early 19th century, which led to the Barbary Wars.

== English version ==
- The Coasts of High Barbary
- High Barbary
- One Hundred English Folksongs By Cecil James Sharp
- High Barbary (West Country tune)
- High Barbaree (capstan chantey version)

== American version ==
- The Coasts of High Barbary
- High Barbary

== Recordings ==
- 1959: The Roger Wagner Chorale on Sea Chanties
- 1969: The McCalmans on Singers Three
- 2006: Joseph Arthur as contribution to Rogue's Gallery: Pirate Ballads, Sea Songs, and Chanteys, ANTI-
- 2009: Blackbeard's Tea Party on Heaven's To Betsy, self-released
- 2010: Sherwood on Sweet Joan, Perekrestok
- 2011: Quadriga Consort on Ships Ahoy!, Alpha
- 2012: Wilderun on Olden Tales and Deathly Trails, Independent
- 2019: Fisherman's Friends on Fisherman's Friends (film) album, Universal Records.
