= Burke & Hare (2010 film) =

2010 British comedy film by John Landis

- British release poster
- Directed by: John Landis
- Screenplay by: Piers Ashworth; Nick Moorcroft
- Produced by: Barnaby Thompson
- Starring: Simon Pegg; Andy Serkis; Isla Fisher; Tom Wilkinson; Jessica Hynes; Bill Bailey; Tim Curry
- Cinematography: John Mathieson
- Edited by: Mark Everson
- Music by: Joby Talbot
- Production companies: Ealing Studios; Fragile Films; Aegis Film Fund; Prescience; Quickfire Films
- Distributed by: Entertainment Film Distributors
- Release date: 29 October 2010
- Running time: 91 minutes
- Country: United Kingdom
- Language: English
- Budget: $10 million
- Box office: $4.3 million

Burke & Hare is a 2010 British black comedy film, loosely based on the Burke and Hare murders of 1828. Directed by John Landis from an original screenplay by Nick Moorcroft and Piers Ashworth, the film stars Simon Pegg and Andy Serkis as William Burke and William Hare respectively and Tim Curry in his final acting film role. It was Landis' first feature film release in 12 years, the last being 1998's Susan's Plan. The film was released in the United Kingdom on 29 October 2010. It is the final live-action film of Tim Curry prior to his stroke in 2012 and eventual death in 2026. As of 2026, this is Landis' most recent feature film directorial effort.

== Plot ==
William Burke and William Hare, immigrants from Ulster, attempt to sell cheese mould as a patent medicine. When their fraud is discovered, they flee to an inn owned by Hare's wife, Lucky. One of her lodgers has died and she wants Burke and Hare to remove the body. On the way, they stop for a drink and Hare hears from Fergus, a local henchman of villain Danny McTavish, that Dr Robert Knox pays for cadavers, especially now demand has gone up. Burke and Hare decide to sell the corpse to Knox. They are forced to break the corpse's spine to fit it into a barrel in order to smuggle it through the city. Burke and Hare present the now-mangled corpse to Knox. After some negotiation, Knox agrees to pay them a good sum of money for each corpse they bring him for dissection.

Burke and Hare try grave-digging to procure more cadavers. They accidentally dig up a long-dead body and are then caught by the militia, who chase them out of the cemetery, shooting Burke in the rear end in the pursuit. Back at the inn, they find Lucky drunk and barely conscious. Lucky says she is drinking because Joseph, another lodger at the inn, is near death. Not willing to wait for the outcome, Burke and Hare suffocate Joseph and take the body to Knox. Flush with money, Burke and Hare dress up for a night in a posher pub. There they meet a young former prostitute, Ginny Hawkins, who performs an excerpt from Macbeth to the indifferent patrons. Burke is instantly taken with Ginny.

Hare comes home to find Lucky in good spirits and waiting with a home-cooked meal. He is suspicious, then scared when Lucky tells him she knows what he and Burke have been up to. Surprisingly, she thinks it a good idea and makes Hare give her a pound per corpse as a tax between husband and wife.

Burke is kidnapped and bundled into a carriage by McTavish and Fergus, who have already captured Hare. McTavish threatens to kill them unless they give him half the money from Knox. Forced to agree, they are then thrown from the carriage. As they trek back to the inn, they plan a string of murders to make up their losses to McTavish.

The people of Edinburgh become suspicious of all the deaths in the area, as does police captain Tom McLintock of the militia. Missing posters of the dead are put up and Burke begins to panic. Hare says they have finished the murders and will go into the funeral parlour business.

McTavish kidnaps Hare again and attempts to extort the remainder of the money. Shortly afterward, McTavish appears as Knox's next dissection cadaver, where McLintock recognises his body. He discovers Knox's collection of anatomical photographs, recognising many of the photos as people who were reported missing. Knox confesses his arrangement with Burke and Hare. McLintock arrests Burke and Ginny, and Hare and Lucky, while both couples are having sex.

In prison, Burke is repentant but Hare tells him not to confess or all of them, including the women, will be hanged. Meanwhile, the Solicitor General and the Lord Provost want to keep the scandal out of the papers, as the news would ruin the reputation of Edinburgh's medical schools and the money they generate. They bribe McLintock into a deal by making him a colonel. Knox's anatomical photographs are destroyed.

McLintock tells the prisoners that if any one of them confesses to the murders, the others will go free. Burke agrees to confess so that Ginny can go free, his last words at his hanging being that he did it for love. The credits then tells of the fates of all the characters in the story, concluding with the actual skeleton of William Burke at the Anatomical Museum of the University of Edinburgh Medical School.

== Cast ==
- Simon Pegg as William Burke
- Andy Serkis as William Hare
- Isla Fisher as Ginny Hawkins
- Tom Wilkinson as Dr. Robert Knox
- Tim Curry as Professor Alexander Monro
- Jessica Hynes as Margaret "Lucky" Hare
- Bill Bailey as Angus
- Hugh Bonneville as Charles Stanhope, 3rd Earl of Harrington
- Allan Corduner as Joseph Nicéphore Niépce
- Simon Farnaby as William Wordsworth
- David Hayman as Danny McTavish
- David Schofield as Fergus
- Ronnie Corbett as Captain Tom McLintock
- Reece Shearsmith as Sergeant McKenzie
- Christian Brassington as Charles Darwin
- Michael Smiley as Patterson
- Christopher Lee as Old Joseph
- Jenny Agutter as Lucy
- Georgia King as Emma
- John Woodvine as Lord Provost
- Steven Spiers as McMartin's Doorman
- Stephen Merchant as Holyrood Footman
- Paul Whitehouse as Gentleman Drunk
- Michael Winner as Gentleman Passenger
- Max Landis as Handsome Coachman
- Ray Harryhausen as Distinguished Doctor

== Production ==
=== Development ===
Burke & Hare was developed by Ealing Studios, who had been known for producing acclaimed black comedy films such as Kind Hearts and Coronets and The Ladykillers. John Landis read the screenplay, which piqued his interest in making the film. Landis wanted the film to be similar in style to Ealing's black comedies, as well as to the films of Laurel and Hardy, describing the portrayal of William Burke and William Hare in this film as an "evil Laurel and Hardy".

=== Casting ===
David Tennant was originally cast in the role of William Hare, but left the production before principal photography began; he was replaced by Andy Serkis. Many cast members of the sitcom Spaced appear, including Simon Pegg, Jessica Hynes, Bill Bailey, Reece Shearsmith and Michael Smiley. Three actors from the John Landis film An American Werewolf in London appear: Jenny Agutter, David Schofield and John Woodvine. Landis' son Max also makes a cameo appearance.

=== Filming ===
Filming took place around Edinburgh with some scenes also being shot in Stirling, London and at Knole in Kent, and also at Ealing Studios. The script was written by Piers Ashworth and Nick Moorcroft, who previously wrote St Trinian's, also for Ealing, which was the highest grossing British independent film of the last 10 years.

Landis stated:

Working at a revitalised Ealing Studios will be a great honour (...) Films like Kind Hearts and Coronets and The Ladykillers have been guiding examples to me over the years, and I hope to honour that mix of darkness and comedy again with Burke and Hare.

The first official trailer for the film was released on 5 October 2010. It was shown in some UK cinemas before Paranormal Activity 2. It was released on 29 October 2010.

== Reception ==
Rotten Tomatoes, a review aggregator, reports that 33% of 58 surveyed critics gave the film a positive review; the average rating was 4.9/10. The website's critics consensus reads: "Marked by timid scares and flat-footed humor, Burke and Hare is a missed opportunity for its talented cast and a disappointing return for director John Landis." Metacritic, which uses a weighted average, assigned the film a score of 46 out of 100, based on 10 critics, indicating "mixed or average" reviews. Nathan Rabin of The A.V. Club rated it B and called it a "minor but welcome return" for Landis. Neil Genzlinger of The New York Times described it as "a ghoulish comedy" not for nitpickers. Charles Gant of Variety called it an "amiable, creaky comedy" that represents "a step back from the brink" for Landis. Ray Bennett of The Hollywood Reporter wrote that it is "unpleasant drivel that tries to make fun out of murder."

== See also ==
- The Greed of William Hart (1948)
- The Flesh and the Fiends (1960)
- Burke & Hare (1972)
- The Doctor and the Devils (1985)
