= St Trinian's 2: The Legend of Fritton's Gold =

2009 British film

- British release poster
- Directed by: Oliver Parker; Barnaby Thompson
- Written by: Piers Ashworth; Nick Moorcroft
- Based on: Characters by Ronald Searle
- Produced by: Oliver Parker; Barnaby Thompson
- Starring: Rupert Everett; Colin Firth; David Tennant; Talulah Riley; Jodie Whittaker; Juno Temple; Tamsin Egerton; Toby Jones; Celia Imrie; Gemma Arterton
- Cinematography: David Higgs
- Edited by: Emma E. Hickox
- Music by: Charlie Mole
- Production companies: Ealing Studios; Fragile Films
- Distributed by: Entertainment Film Distributors
- Release date: 18 December 2009
- Running time: 106 minutes
- Country: United Kingdom
- Language: English
- Box office: £11.1 million

St Trinian's 2: The Legend of Fritton's Gold is a 2009 British adventure comedy film directed by Oliver Parker and Barnaby Thompson, both of whom directed the previous film in the series. It is the seventh in a long-running series of films based on the works of cartoonist Ronald Searle, and the second film produced since the franchise was rebooted in 2007. Similar to the first film, it was met with mixed critical reception while failing to match its commercial success.

== Plot ==
Following the events of the first film, a new term begins at St Trinian's with Annabelle Fritton appointed as the new Head Girl. Meanwhile, new student Roxy is introduced to the various school cliques—the Chavs/Rude Girls, the Emos, the Posh Totties and the Geeks. Along with two new groups, the Flammables and the Ecos—with Roxy choosing not to join any of them.

Later, the girls catch Celia, a member of the eco sect, retrieving an old ring from the school's Fritton Archives. Celia explains that an unknown man telephoned her to retrieve it for him in exchange for £20,000. Seeking to get more, Annabelle demands £100,000 from the man when he calls back, only for him to refuse and threaten the girls for their greed. When the school's power is cut, the girls ask their headmistress, Camilla Fritton, Annabelle's aunt, about why the ring might be so valuable.

Camilla recognizes the ring as one of two created by a pirate ancestor of hers and Annabelle's in 1589, which, when united, reveal the path to a buried treasure hidden somewhere in the world. Shortly after this discovery, the school is attacked by masked men led by Sir Piers Pomfrey—a man of impeccable reputation and a descendant of the man robbed by Camilla's pirate ancestor—who steals the ring in a bid to find the treasure himself.

Seeking to stop him, the girls search for the second ring and find a clue left by another ancestor who located the second ring and left it in the archives. After a difficult time deciphering a clue they left, the girls find it to be hidden within a boys' school, leaving a group to infiltrate it in disguise and recover it. Seeking to recover the first ring, the girls learn that Piers is the leader of a secret society known as AD1, a masculinist brotherhood, and that Camilla's old flame and former head of education, Geoffrey Thwaites, knows about him and the society.

After tracking him down at a pub, Camilla convinces him to help them—whereupon she puts him through a course to help him overcome his need for drink—and assigns him to work undercover at AD1's hideout, with Annabelle calling in the former head girl Kelly, now an M.I.7 agent, to assist in the recovery of the ring. Despite the girls not finding it in the vault, Geoffrey spots it being worn by Piers and manages to steal it from him, returning it to St Trinian's.

Finding that the two rings bear longitude and latitude coordinates respectively on them, the girls find that the treasure is buried under the Globe Theatre. After organising a flash mob to keep AD1 from pursuing them—after Piers learns they recovered the first ring—Camilla, Geoffrey, the school's bursar, Annabelle and a small group of the girls make it to the theatre, and while the girls head underneath the building, Camilla and Geoffrey pose as actors they knocked out to avoid raising any alarm.

Although the girls make it to the treasure's location within a secret room, they discover a chest within containing nothing more than a note from Pirate Fritton, who gave up being a pirate to write plays under the name of William Shakespeare, and that the treasure was the final play he wrote intended to reveal that "he" was a woman. Piers, managing to track them down, holds them at gunpoint and steals the play's script from them, revealing that his ancestors knew Captain Fritton was a woman (and Shakespeare) and that he had always intended to find the play and destroy it so that nobody else would find out. The girls watch as he flees the scene on his private boat.

Seeking to stop him, the girls take control of the reconstruction of the Golden Hind and sail it down the Thames, whereupon they attack Piers' boat, with Camilla recovering the play's script from him. The girls soon return to St Trinian's for a wild party to celebrate their success, while Piers is exposed for being a sexist after AD1 is revealed to the media.

== Cast ==
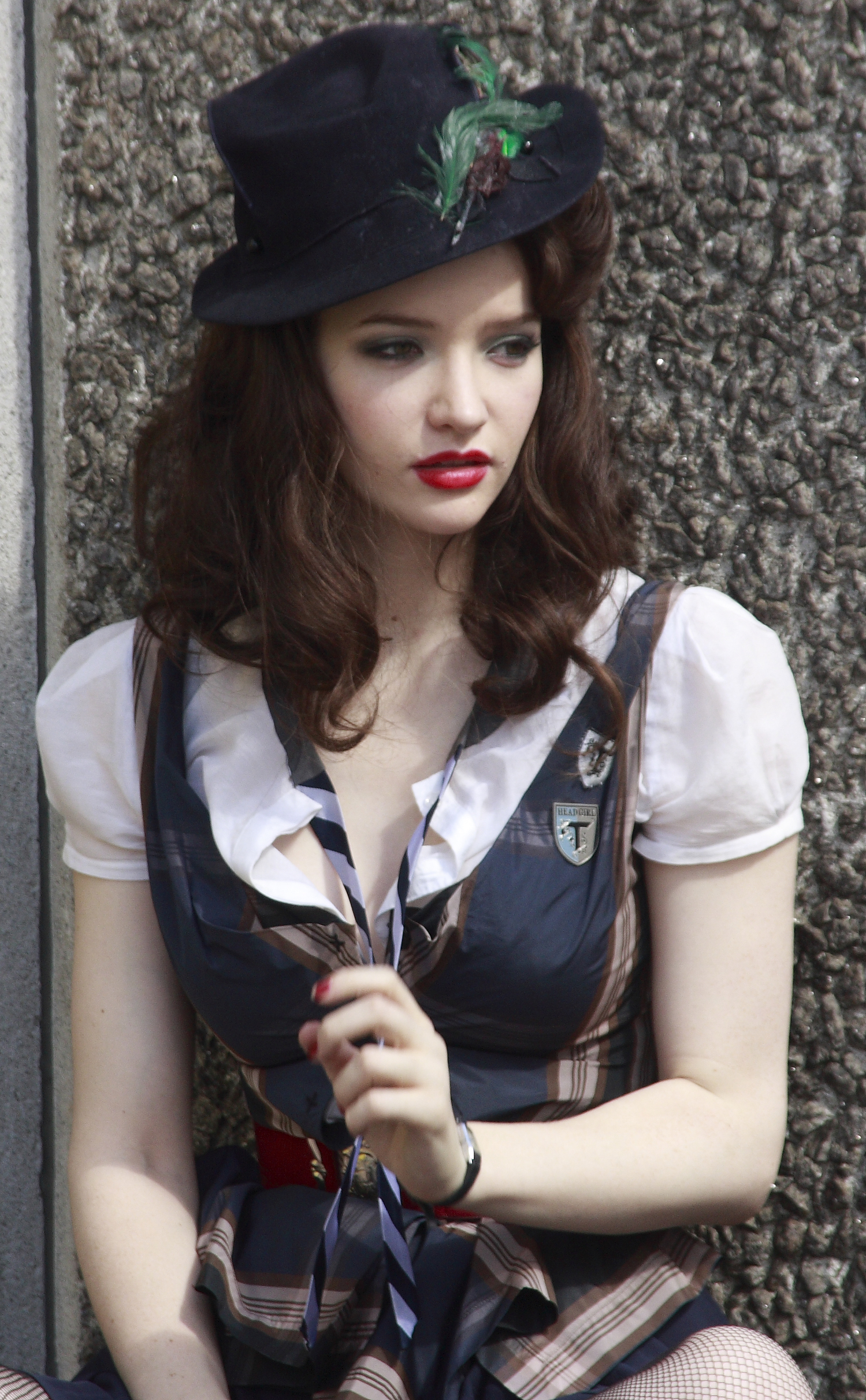
Talulah Riley during filming in August 2009

- Rupert Everett as Camilla / Captain Archibald Fritton / Reverend Fortnum Fritton
- Colin Firth as Geoffrey Thwaites
- David Tennant as Piers Pomfrey, a well-known wealthy philanthropist who is friends with many powerful people. He is also secretly the leader of AD1, a masculinist brotherhood with a narrow-minded view on gender roles. He is the descendant of the Lord Pomfrey robbed by Captain Fritton in 1589.
- Talulah Riley as Annabelle Fritton, Headmistress Fritton's niece and the new head girl of St Trinian's
- Jodie Whittaker as Beverly, the receptionist at St Trinian's
- Juno Temple as Celia, an Eco
- Tamsin Egerton as Chelsea, a Posh Totty
- Toby Jones as Bursar
- Sarah Harding as Roxy, a new girl at St Trinian's school with a rebellious and unsociable attitude, plus rocker style
- Zawe Ashton as Bianca, a member of the Chavs/Rude Girls
- Montserrat Lombard as Zoe, an Emo
- Ella Smith as Lucy, a Geek
- Celia Imrie as Matron
- Clara Paget as Bella
- Gabriella Wilde as Saffy
- Cloe and Holly Mackie as Tania & Tara, twins
- The Band of St Trinians [Jessica Agombar, Harriet Bamford, Jessica Bell, Daisy Tonge]
- Christian Brassington as Peters
- Oscar as Heathcliff, a dog
- Gemma Arterton as Kelly, the previous head girl of St Trinian's, before Annabelle, now an M.I.7 agent.
- Tom Riley as Romeo actor
- Georgia King as Juliet actor
- Katherine Parkinson as Physics Teacher
- Pip Torrens as Heathcote Parker
- Steve Furst as Arbuthnott
- Ricky Wilson as Rockstar

== Production ==
Principal photography started in July 2009, at Ealing Studios and on location in various places in London, including the Globe Theatre and on (and in) the River Thames. The 'Old Boys School' was filmed at Charterhouse School in Godalming, Surrey and the boys choir was the Guildford Cathedral Choir. On 16 August 2009, hundreds of extras, along with the main characters, filmed a mass dance scene in the style of a flash mob at London's Liverpool Street Station.

The manor house used as the girls school is Knebworth House in Hertfordshire.

== Release ==
It was announced at the 2008 Cannes Film Festival that St Trinian's 2: The Legend of Fritton's Gold was to be released on 18 December 2009.

=== Box office ===
It opened at #2 in the United Kingdom, just behind James Cameron's 3D sci fi epic Avatar, with debut week end box office figures of £1,586,832. As of 10 February 2010, the film has grossed a total of £7,019,714 in the United Kingdom, considerably lower than the first instalment's £12,280,529. It became the fourth biggest film of the Christmas season of 2009: ahead were Alvin and the Chipmunks: The Squeakquel, Guy Ritchie's Sherlock Holmes, and Avatar.

=== Critical reception ===
The film received overwhelmingly negative reviews. It holds a 14% "rotten" rating on Rotten Tomatoes based on 21 reviews, with an average score of 3.55/10.

== Home media ==
The region 2 DVD of the film was released on 24 May 2010. A region 1 DVD release occurred on 23 March 2011.
