= Finding Your Feet =

2017 British film by Richard Loncraine

- Theatrical release poster
- Directed by: Richard Loncraine
- Written by: Nick Moorcroft; Meg Leonard
- Produced by: Nick Moorcroft; Meg Leonard; John Sachs; Andrew Berg; James Spring; Charlotte Walls
- Starring: Imelda Staunton; Timothy Spall; Celia Imrie; Joanna Lumley; David Hayman; John Sessions; Josie Lawrence
- Cinematography: John Pardue
- Edited by: Johnny Daukes
- Music by: Michael J McEvoy
- Production companies: Eclipse Films; Powder Keg Pictures; Catalyst Global Media; Fred Films; Bob & Co.; Twickenham Studios; Ultimate Pictures; Protagonist Pictures
- Distributed by: Entertainment One
- Release dates: 2 November 2017 (AFM); 23 February 2018 (United Kingdom)
- Running time: 111 minutes
- Country: United Kingdom
- Language: English
- Budget: $7 million
- Box office: $15.8 million

Finding Your Feet is a 2017 British romantic comedy film directed by Richard Loncraine and written by Nick Moorcroft and Meg Leonard. The film stars Imelda Staunton, Timothy Spall, Celia Imrie, Joanna Lumley and David Hayman, and was released on 23 February 2018 in the United Kingdom.

== Plot ==
Sandra Abbott, Lady Abbott, discovers that her recently knighted husband of 35 years, Mike, is having an affair with her best friend Pamela. Sandra seeks refuge in London with her estranged older sister Bif. Sandra had married for stability and security, so is a fish out of water next to her outspoken, serial-dating, free-spirited sibling who lives on an inner-city council estate.

Dining and drinking in an Asian restaurant with Bif, Sandra gets belligerent and has a confrontation with the owner, throwing food at him. She is taken away by the police and stays overnight to sleep it off.

In the morning at Bif's, Mike calls to inform Sandra that he is moving in with Pamela, which triggers an attack. Bif gets called to the hospital, so Charlie helps her collect Sandra, discovering it had been an anxiety attack. On the way back, Sandra butts heads with them both, appalled that they are getting high on weed. Later, Bif chastises her for putting on airs.

Sandra lets Bif drag her along to her community dance class, after being reminded that she used to ballroom dance. There, she again sees Charlie and meets her sister's other friends, Jackie and Ted. Jackie has been divorced a few times and Ted is mourning his wife.

Sandra's daughter Nicola and grandson Luke come for a visit, but Bif has a date. Sandra has to answer Luke's difficult questions. Later that night, Bif takes Gerald back to the flat; as she is doing a striptease for him, he dies from the excitement.

Dancing with Charlie, Sandra gradually begins to enjoy herself. However, when their teacher seeks volunteers to participate in a charity dance show, she refuses.

Charlie lives on a narrow houseboat, having sold his house to pay for his wife's dementia care home. After a multitude of visits to her, where she doesn't recognise him nor appreciate his coming, he stops trying.

After receiving Mike's divorce petition, Sandra goes with Bif to ready her large Tudor-style home for sale, using a wood chipper on Mike's tennis trophies to release her frustration. Charlie and Ted help them remove her things from the house. Later at the pub, the four bump into Mike and Pamela and Sandra effectively shames them.

At the last minute, Sandra joins the others in the charity street performance. Afterwards, celebrating on Ted and Charlie's houseboats, Charlie tells Sandra his plan to cross the Channel in his and explore the canals of France.

Sandra even goes outdoor swimming with Bif. Later on, although they'd made a plan to see the Christmas lights with Charlie, Bif bows out. Unbeknownst to them, she is in the hospital running tests. When a tow truck is about to take Charlie's old van for illegal parking, he drives it off the back and speeds away.

An Italian dance festival promoter sees a video of the dance group on social media and invites them to Rome for two days in February. While Sandra and Charlie grow closer, Bif finds out she is dying from lung cancer. She tells Sandra about it the day after Christmas. The only other person they tell is Charlie, who also respects Bif's wishes to not tell anyone.

The group goes to Italy, enjoys themselves and performs, although Bif is in obvious pain. Sandra and Charlie go for a walk afterwards and, when it seems he is about to propose marriage and Sandra is ready to accept, he tells her about his wife. Not wanting to be the 'other woman', Sandra walks away.

The following morning, Sandra finds that Bif has died during the night. Back home, Sandra scatters her ashes in the Hampstead Heath Ponds where they had swum, after a brief eulogy among friends and family. Her former husband catches up with her in the woods afterwards, persuading her to return home as his relationship with Pamela is over.

Sandra returns to her old home and life. A letter from Charlie arrives telling her his wife has died and he is off to France. At her birthday party, after Mike scolds her for dancing Gangnam style with Luke at his request, Sandra realises she no longer wants her old kind of life. She leaves in the middle of the party to join Charlie on his boat. As he has already left his mooring, she literally takes a leap of faith from the river bank.

== Cast ==
- Imelda Staunton as Sandra
- Timothy Spall as Charlie
- Celia Imrie as Bif
- Joanna Lumley as Jackie
- David Hayman as Ted
- John Sessions as Sir Mike
- Josie Lawrence as Pamela
- Indra Ové as Corrina
- Sian Thomas as Lilly

== Production ==
The film was announced at the 2016 Cannes Film Festival and started shooting on 31 October 2016, in London and Rome. The film wrapped on 16 December 2016. The film was released nationwide in the United Kingdom and Ireland on 23 February 2018. Roadside Attractions picked up the U.S. distribution rights at the American Film Market on 2 November 2017, planning to release the film theatrically in America on 30 March 2018.

== Release ==
On 20 October 2017, it was announced that Finding Your Feet would open the 35th Torino Film Festival. The director Richard Loncraine, and the actors Timothy Spall and Celia Imrie presented the feature (re-titled Ricomincio da me) at the festival in Turin on 24 November 2017. TFF is the second largest film festival in Italy, following the Venice Film Festival. Finding Your Feet is distributed in Italy by CINEMA owned by veteran film distributor Valerio De Paolis.

It was announced in The Hollywood Reporter on 15 December 2017, the film will have its North American premiere at the 29th Palm Springs International Film Festival on 6 January 2018. The film was named as one of the 'best of the fest' and screened again for the public on 15 January.

== Reception ==
=== Critical response ===
On review aggregator website Rotten Tomatoes, the film holds a fresh approval rating of 70% based on 88 reviews, with an average rating of 5.8/10. The website's critical consensus reads, "Finding Your Feet wears its heart on its sleeve, elevating undemanding material with a feel-good romance and sweet performances from its over-qualified cast." Metacritic gave the film a weighted average score of 53 out of 100, based on 15 critics, indicating "average or mixed reviews".

Australian film critic Stephen Romei of The Australian awarded the film 4 stars and said "Finding Your Feet is rightly billed as comedy-drama; yet, although it’s full of rib-tickling dialogue, it’s the drama that cuts deep". Mark Kermode reviewed the film favourably on BBC Radio 5 Live. Kevin Maher from The Times said it was "oddly adorable". Andy Lea of The Sunday Express awarded the film 4 stars and said "it’s big-hearted, touching, smartly-written and beautifully performed by a hugely talented cast". Allan Hunter said in The Daily Express that it was "a sentimental tearjerker elevated by a top-notch British cast". Linda Marric from HeyUGuys said the film was "a charming, oft-told tale of second chances in life and love, filled with fine performances." Francesca Rudkin of The New Zealand Herald compared Finding Your Feet to The Best Exotic Marigold Hotel and Calendar Girls and said the film was a charming, if somewhat predictable, crowd-pleaser about embracing life in your later years. Emma Simmonds from The List said "the joie de vivre of these convention-defying pensioners is ultimately irresistible." Louise Keller from Urban Cinefile said "Finding Your Feet may be predictable fare, but it has a heart of solid gold". James Mottram from Total Film said "Its love-in-later-life insights are well-worn, but with Staunton on song, Richard Loncraine's film mines genuine feeling". In another positive review, The Film Blog called Finding Your Feet "A Billy Elliot for Seniors with a meaningful slice of warmth and humour".

=== Box office ===
The film was released on 475 screens on 23 February in the United Kingdom and debuted at #4 in the chart grossing $1,290,495 in its opening weekend. The film went on to gross $7,891,508. The film performed equally as well in Australia and New Zealand, grossing $5.53 million. As of 13 July 2018, the film had grossed $16,881,861 million worldwide, making it one of the most successful independent British films of 2017 and 2018.

=== Home media ===
The film was released on DVD and Blu-ray in the United Kingdom on 25 June 2018.

Following on from the film's box-office success, Finding Your Feet was the #2 film in the official U.K. DVD and Blu-ray chart, behind The Greatest Showman, which narrowly took the number-one spot. The Best Picture Oscar winner, The Shape of Water, debuted at #5.

=== Awards ===
On 15 January 2018 the film won the Audience Award for Best Film at the Palm Springs International Film Festival.

== French remake ==
A French remake of Finding Your Feet based on the original screenplay written by Nick Moorcroft & Meg Leonard started shooting in Paris, France, on August 10, 2020. The film, entitled Alors On Danse was directed, adapted by and stars Michèle Laroque and was theatrically released by UGC nationwide in France on January 22, 2022. The film features an all-star French cast including Thierry Lhermitte, Isabelle Nanty and Jean-Hugues Anglade.
