= Blithe Spirit (2020 film) =

2020 film by Edward Hall

- Theatrical release poster with original release window
- Directed by: Edward Hall
- Screenplay by: Nick Moorcroft; Meg Leonard; Piers Ashworth
- Based on: Blithe Spirit; 1941 play by Noël Coward
- Produced by: Nick Moorcroft; Meg Leonard; Hilary Bevan Jones; Peter Snell; James Spring
- Starring: Dan Stevens; Leslie Mann; Isla Fisher; Judi Dench; Emilia Fox; Julian Rhind-Tutt; Adil Ray; Michele Dotrice; Aimee-Ffion Edwards; Charlie Carter
- Cinematography: Ed Wilde
- Edited by: Paul Tothil
- Music by: Simon Boswell
- Production companies: StudioCanal; Protagonist Pictures; Fred Films; Powder Keg Pictures; Align Pictures; British Lion
- Distributed by: Sky
- Release dates: 8 October 2020 (Mill Valley Film Festival); 15 January 2021 (United Kingdom)
- Running time: 95 minutes
- Country: United Kingdom
- Language: English
- Box office: $890,492

Blithe Spirit is a 2020 British supernatural comedy film set in the late 1930s, directed by Edward Hall in his feature film debut, and starring Dan Stevens, Leslie Mann, Isla Fisher, Judi Dench, Emilia Fox, Julian Rhind-Tutt, Adil Ray, Michele Dotrice, and Aimee-Ffion Edwards. Based upon the 1941 comic farce play of the same name by Noël Coward, the film is a significantly reworked adaptation for the screen by Nick Moorcroft, Meg Leonard, and Piers Ashworth. This is the second feature film adaptation of Coward's play after the 1945 version directed by David Lean.

Blithe Spirit had its world premiere at the 2020 Mill Valley Film Festival, and was released in the United Kingdom on 15 January 2021. The film received generally negative reviews from critics.

== Plot ==
In 1937, the once successful playwright Charles Condomine is suffering from depression and writer's block that is affecting his five-year marriage to Ruth. After a performance by popular medium Madame Arcati ends in fiasco, as a kind of publicity act, the medium performs a private séance at the Condomines' home and accidentally summons the ghost of his wilful and temperamental first wife, Elvira, who died in the house seven years prior.

It transpires that Elvira was behind much of Charles's creative writing — her absence is the reason for his inability to produce anything new. Conflict follows as Elvira's spirit becomes jealous of Ruth, Charles's new wife, and she attempts to drive Ruth away. Charles now has to balance between the two women, and protect Ruth from Elvira as he is the only one who can actually see her.

== Cast ==
- Dan Stevens as Charles Condomine, one-time successful playwright
- Leslie Mann as Elvira Condomine, Charles's deceased first wife
- Isla Fisher as Ruth Condomine, Charles's second wife
- Judi Dench as Madame Arcati, professional spiritualist and medium
- Emilia Fox as Violet Bradman, friend & neighbour of the Condomines
- Julian Rhind-Tutt as Dr George Bradman, husband of Mrs Bradman
- Adil Ray as Mandeep Singh
- Michele Dotrice as Edna, the Condomines' cook
- Aimee-Ffion Edwards as Edith, the Condomines' maid
- Issy van Randwyck as Margot
- Dave Johns as Harold
- Simon Kunz as Henry Mackintosh
- Peter A. Rogers as Alfred Hitchcock
- Colin Stinton as Cecil B. DeMille
- Stella Stocker as Greta Garbo
- Jaymes Sygrove as Clark Gable
- Georgina Rich as Hedda Hopper

== Production ==
In May 2019, it was announced Dan Stevens, Isla Fisher, and Judi Dench had joined the cast of the film, with Edward Hall directing from a screenplay by Piers Ashworth, Meg Leonard and Nick Moorcroft. In June 2019, Leslie Mann, Julian Rhind-Tutt, Emilia Fox, Dave Johns and James Fleet joined the cast of the film.

Principal photography began near Sydney in June 2019.

== Release ==
The film premiered on 8 October 2020 at the Mill Valley Film Festival, and was screened later in the same month at the San Diego International Film Festival. The film was scheduled to be released in the United Kingdom on 1 May 2020, but was delayed to 4 September 2020 because of the COVID-19 pandemic. It was then further delayed to 25 December 2020. In November 2020, Sky acquired the British distribution rights, and the film was released on the Sky Cinema channel on 15 January 2021. IFC Films distributed the film in the United States.

== Home media ==
Blithe Spirit was released on DVD and Blu-Ray on 26 April 2021 by Warner Bros. Home Entertainment under Universal Pictures Home Entertainment, which includes interviews from the cast and additional bonus features. The movie was released and distributed in the Nordic countries as My Better Halves.

== Reception ==
=== Box office ===
In its opening weekend in the United States, the film grossed $98,100 from 239 theaters. It was also the most-rented title on the Apple TV's indie movie chart, and ninth overall.

=== Critical response ===
Review aggregator Rotten Tomatoes reports an approval rating of 29% based on 77 reviews, with an average rating of 4.7/10. The website's critics consensus reads: "An indifferent adaptation of classic source material, Blithe Spirit puts a star-studded cast through the motions without capturing the story's screwball spark." According to Metacritic, which sampled 16 critics and calculated a weighted average score of 26 out of 100, the film received "generally unfavorable reviews".

== See also ==
- Blithe Spirit (1945 film)
