= Fisherman's Friends (film) =

2019 British film by Chris Foggin

- Directed by: Chris Foggin
- Written by: Nick Moorcroft; Meg Leonard; Piers Ashworth
- Produced by: Nick Moorcroft; Meg Leonard; James Spring
- Starring: Daniel Mays; James Purefoy; David Hayman; Dave Johns; Sam Swainsbury; Tuppence Middleton; Noel Clarke
- Cinematography: Simon Tindall
- Edited by: Johnny Daukes
- Music by: Rupert Christie
- Production companies: Head Gear Films; Metrol Technology; Kreo Films; Fred Films; Powder Keg Pictures; Umedia; Hindsight Productions
- Distributed by: Entertainment Film Distributors
- Release date: 15 March 2019 (United Kingdom)
- Running time: 112 minutes
- Country: United Kingdom
- Language: English
- Box office: $11,647,462

Fisherman's Friends is a 2019 British comedy-drama film directed by Chris Foggin from a screenplay by Nick Moorcroft, Meg Leonard and Piers Ashworth.

The film was inspired by a true story about Fisherman's Friends, a group of Cornish fishermen from Port Isaac who were signed by Universal Records and achieved a top 10 hit with their debut album of traditional sea shanties.

The film stars Daniel Mays, James Purefoy, David Hayman, Dave Johns, Sam Swainsbury, Tuppence Middleton, Noel Clarke, Christian Brassington, Maggie Steed and Jade Anouka.

== Plot ==
Danny, a London music executive, travels to Cornwall for a colleague’s stag weekend. While there, his boss challenges him to try to secure a record deal with a group of local fishermen who perform sea shanties. Although he initially treats the idea as a joke, Danny approaches the group, whose members are wary of the music industry and uninterested in commercial success. As he spends more time in the village, he becomes involved in the community and begins to reconsider his work and priorities. Danny develops a relationship with Alwyn, the daughter of one of the fishermen, which further complicates his position. He is eventually forced to choose between pursuing the deal on industry terms or respecting the group’s wishes and way of life.

== Cast in contractual order ==
- Daniel Mays as Danny Anderson
- James Purefoy as Jim
- David Hayman as Jago
- Dave Johns as Leadville
- Sam Swainsbury as Rowan
- Tuppence Middleton as Alwyn
- Noel Clarke as Troy
- Christian Brassington as Henry
- Maggie Steed as Maggie
- Vahid Gold as Driss
- Jo Hart as Journalist
- Julian Seager as Treive
- Christopher Villiers as Charles Montague
- Charlotte Baker as Abigail
- Meadow Nobrega as Tamsyn
- Jade Anouka as Leah
- Ashley Bannerman as Nurse

Two-Michelin-starred Port Isaac chef Nathan Outlaw has a cameo role as a man who has unwisely parked his car where the tide can swamp it.

== Production ==
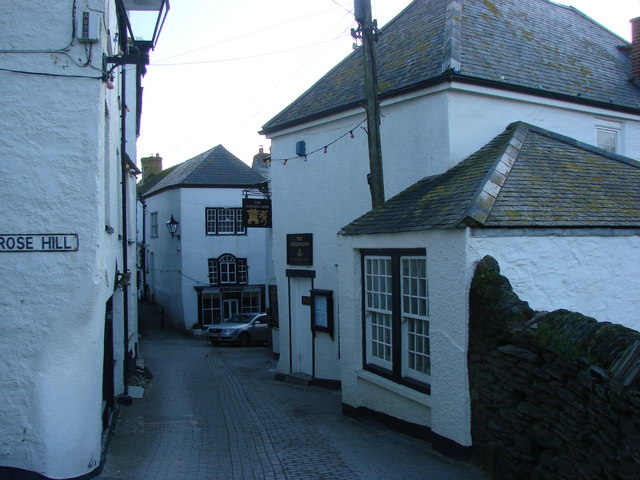
The Golden Lion doubled as the village pub owned by Rowan

Filming commenced on 30 April 2018 on location in Port Isaac, Cornwall, and London for five weeks. All members of the band have cameos in the film and worked as consultants on the film.

== Reception ==
=== Box office ===
The film was released on 503 screens on 15 March 2019 in the United Kingdom and debuted at No. 2 in the UK Box office chart, grossing $1,534,908 in its opening weekend behind Captain Marvel. The film was No. 3 in its second weekend taking $1,285,332. The film was No. 4 in its third weekend taking $820,293. As of Friday 10 May 2020, the film had grossed $11,553,041.

=== Critical response ===
On Rotten Tomatoes it has a 69% rating based on reviews from 58 critics. On Metacritic it has a score of 45% based on reviews from 9 critics, indicating mixed or average reviews.

== Controversy ==
Noel Clarke was credited 'and Noel Clarke' on the UK poster but his image was not featured. Writing on Twitter, Clarke said "not one of these other actors spoke up for me when I was left off the poster".

== Soundtrack ==
Island Records released the film's original soundtrack titled Keep Hauling - Music From The Movie on 15 March 2019.

Track listing:

1. "Keep Hauling"
2. "Nelson's Blood"
3. "John Kanaka"
4. "The Coast of High Barbaree"
5. "South Australia"
6. "Litte Liz I Love You"
7. "Widow Woman"
8. "Le Capitaine de San Malo"
9. "Blow the Man Down"
10. "Shanty Man"
11. "Oh You New York Girls"
12. "The 'Trelawny' National Anthem"
13. "The Leaving Shanty"
14. "No Hopers, Jokers & Rogues"
15. "Fisherman's Blues"
16. "(What Shall We Do with the) Drunken Sailor"
17. "Union of Different Kinds"

== Stage musical adaptation ==
A stage musical called Fisherman's Friends: The Musical, based on the band's true story and the 2019 film, made its world premiere at the Hall for Cornwall in Truro in October 2021, written by Brad Birch and directed by James Grieve.

== Sequel ==
A sequel, about the band singing at Glastonbury, was released on 19 August 2022. The film is called Fisherman's Friends: One and All.
