= Josie Lawrence =

English actress and comedian (born 1959)

- Born: Wendy Lawrence; 6 June 1959 (age 67); Old Hill, Staffordshire, England, United Kingdom
- Occupations: Actress; comedian; screenwriter; activist
- Years active: 1979–present

Josie Lawrence (born Wendy Lawrence; 6 June 1959) is an English actress and comedian. She is best known for her work with the Comedy Store Players improvisational troupe, the television series Whose Line Is It Anyway? and as Manda Best in EastEnders.

== Early life ==
Lawrence was born Wendy Lawrence on 6 June 1959 in Old Hill in the Black Country, West Midlands. Her parents were Bert Lawrence and Kathleen Lawrence, née Griffin, who were married in 1948. She has twin siblings, John and Janet, who are ten years her senior (1949). They were brought up in nearby Cradley Heath, where their father worked for British Leyland and their mother as a dinner lady. Lawrence wanted to be an actress at the early age of 5 and at 16 joined the Barlow Players in Oldbury.

She attended Rowley Regis Grammar School, where she took part in drama. The school closed in 1975, and became the Rowley Sixth Form College, and was later demolished. The St Michael's Church of England High School, Rowley Regis was built on the former site. She started in drama aged 16 with Oldbury Repertory Players playing Honey in Who's Afraid of Virginia Woolf? at Barlow Theatre near Langley Green railway station.

She later studied at Dartington College of Arts from 1978 to 1981, receiving a Bachelor of Arts honours degree.

== Career ==
=== Stage ===
Her first acting role was as a young boy in a production of The Ragged Trousered Philanthropists at the Half Moon Theatre (in 2016 she became a patron of the theatre). During the 1980s, she was also involved in a play called Passionaria at the Newcastle Playhouse, starring Denise Black and Kate McKenzie, and they later formed the jazz group Denise Black and the Kray Sisters.

Her work in comedy began as a result of starring in a Donmar Warehouse play called Songs For Stray Cats and hearing the audience invited to supply lines and ideas for improvisers appearing in after-show cabaret.

I played a manic depressive Glaswegian in the play and I'd seen Jim Sweeney on the circuit when I was a singer with Denise Black and The Kray Sisters. So I stayed behind and watched one night and then, because I knew Jim, I said could I try it because it looked brilliant and it was one of those things I found I could do. You suddenly find your little baby. After that I joined The Comedy Store Players and then this TV show called Whose Line Is It Anyway came along.

She starred as the title character in the 1993 Lyric Theatre, Hammersmith production of the musical Moll Flanders.

From 1994 to 1996, Lawrence played Katharine in the Royal Shakespeare Company production of The Taming of the Shrew in both Stratford-upon-Avon and London, for which she received a Dame Peggy Ashcroft award for Best Actress. She also appeared in Faust and The Cherry Orchard and starred as Benedick in an all-female production of Much Ado About Nothing at Shakespeare's Globe, having played Beatrice previously at Manchester's Royal Exchange. She made her West End theatre debut in 2001 taking over the lead role of Anna in the stage musical The King and I, replacing Elaine Paige. In 2005, she appeared with Victoria Wood, Julie Walters and Celia Imrie in the cult West End production of Wood's Acorn Antiques: The Musical.

In 2008, Lawrence took the lead role in Tom Stoppard's Hapgood at the Birmingham Repertory Theatre and later at the West Yorkshire Playhouse in which she was a secret spymaster given the task of exposing a traitor who is leaking vital information to the Russians. In the same year, she co-directed The Time Step, a comedy about fantasies and talent contests, with Linda Marlowe at the Edinburgh Festival.

Lawrence appeared as Madame Ranevskaya in a new version of Chekhov's The Cherry Orchard, translated by Tom Stoppard, at the Birmingham Repertory Theatre in autumn 2010.

=== Film and television ===
Lawrence came to public attention as a regular performer on the Channel 4 improvisational comedy series Whose Line Is It Anyway? at its launch in 1988. Lawrence's speciality on the show was her ability to improvise songs on the spot. She was the first female performer to appear on the show, featuring in both the original pilot episode and the first broadcast episode. Lawrence was featured on Whose Line until its ninth series in 1997 and 1998, which was the last of the UK series to actually be filmed in the UK. She also performed in two episodes of the American edition of the show in 1999.

In 1991, she had her own short-lived comedy series Josie, also on Channel 4. The next year she starred in Enchanted April, a British remake of the 1935 film based on Elizabeth von Arnim's novel. Her other television work includes the comedy series Not with a Bang and Downwardly Mobile, and she is remembered for her performances as Maggie Costello in the cricketing comedy drama Outside Edge alongside Timothy Spall, Robert Daws, and Brenda Blethyn, for which she was awarded the Spectacle Wearer of the Year award in 1993. She went on to perform in Sealed with a Loving Kiss and Lunch in the Park as part of the Paul Merton in Galton and Simpson's... series on 16 February 1996 and 21 October 1997. She appeared in the 1999 made-for-television film The Flint Street Nativity as both Debbie Bennett and Debbie's mother. In 2000, she played Camilla in A Many Splintered Thing. Between 1999 and 2001, she was the voice of "Duck" in the children's television show Dog and Duck.

In 2006, she starred alongside Peter Davison in The Complete Guide to Parenting as Phoebe Huntley. She has also appeared in the BBC One drama series Robin Hood and as Mrs Jiniwin in the 2007 ITV adaptation of The Old Curiosity Shop. She appeared in an episode of the 2007 E4 teen comedy/drama Skins, playing Liz Jenkins, estranged mother of Sid Jenkins, a role which she reprised in the second series.

Lawrence was in EastEnders from March 2009 to February 2010. She played Manda Best, an old flame of Minty Peterson. She was featured with Meera Syal in a celebrity special of Who Wants to be a Millionaire? that aired on 31 January 2009. She has appeared as a guest on the panel show games QI and Never Mind the Buzzcocks.

In 2010, Lawrence appeared in series 25, episode 3 of Casualty named "The Chaos Theory". Lawrence played Mrs Janet Haines, head teacher of a school where sixteen children were admitted to the emergency department having taken LSD. Also in 2010, she played the part of Sandra, Tony's agent, in the 2010 British feature film version of Tony Hawks' best selling book Round Ireland with a Fridge that was released in September 2010 and was released on DVD in November 2010.

In 2012, she appeared in Doctors alongside Louise Jameson who has also appeared in EastEnders. Lawrence played Cathy Dayman, and Jameson played Shirley Carter. Also in 2012, she appeared on one episode of the US improv series, Trust Us With Your Life, similar to Whose Line is it Anyway?, but never made it to air.

Lawrence provided the voice of "The Brain" in the 2015 BBC Two quiz show Beat The Brain.

In 2016, she played Barbara, a synthetic marriage counsellor in series 2 of the Channel 4 television series Humans.

In 2018, she played the lover of a married man portrayed by former "Whose Line" castmate John Sessions in the feature film Finding Your Feet.

In 2019, she played Agnes Nutter in the Amazon Prime series Good Omens.

In 2020, she appeared in the BBC television series Shakespeare & Hathaway: Private Investigators episode 3.5 "Thy Fury Spent" as Dr Helen Middleton.

=== Radio ===
Lawrence starred in three series of the improvised comedy series The Masterson Inheritance from 1993 to 1995 on BBC Radio 4 alongside Paul Merton, Phelim McDermott, Caroline Quentin, Lee Simpson and Jim Sweeney. Each episode comprised a different time period, and the plots were improvised based on suggestions from the studio audience. One unaired episode was produced and narrated by Lawrence, but it was released on the internet by Jim Sweeney on his official site.

The BBC Radio 4 series The Lawrence Sweeney Mix aired from 27 February to 20 March 2007 and was described as "Josie Lawrence and Jim Sweeney create improvised sketches from audience suggestions". Series 2 began airing on 29 January 2008.

She has starred in three other BBC Radio 4 comedy series: the science fiction comedy Married in 1996 and the dark comedy series Vent in 2006 as well as appearing in a Galton and Simpson Radio Playhouse 50th Anniversary recording of Clicquot et Fils alongside Richard Griffiths and Roger Lloyd-Pack that originally aired on 29 December 1998.

In December 2004, BBC Radio 3 broadcast an adaptation by Jim Poyser of The Provoked Wife originally written by John Vanbrugh and directed by Pauline Harris. The cast included Lawrence as Lady Fanciful.

She played the role of 'Amanda' in the comedy series Reluctant Persuaders on BBC Radio 4.

Lawrence made her debut appearance in the long-running BBC Radio 4 show Just a Minute on 7 January 2008 and returned again in the following series.

In December 2014, Lawrence played the role of Agnes Nutter in an adaptation of Terry Pratchett and Neil Gaiman's book Good Omens for BBC Radio 4. In 2019, she reprised the role for the Amazon/BBC television production of the book.

=== Audio books ===
Lawrence has lent her voice to several audiobooks, the majority of which were books for children. She has recorded several of the books in Roger Hargreaves' Little Miss series, namely, Bossy, Giggles, Trouble, Tiny, Sunshine, Naughty, Somersault and Neat and four of Jacqueline Wilson's books, Secrets, The Illustrated Mum, Bad Girls and The Bed and Breakfast Star. She has also recorded books from Emma Thomson's Felicity Wishes, Eric Hill's Spot the Dog and Tony Bradman's Dilly the Dinosaur, as well as Philip Ridley's Mercedes Ice and Julia Donaldson and Axel Scheffler's Room on the Broom as well as the 2005 Muffin The Mule story books for a grand CD release. For adults, Lawrence has recorded audiocassettes of Rosie Thomas's Sun at Midnight, Lynne Truss's Going Loco and Daphne du Maurier's Jamaica Inn.

=== Video games ===
She appeared on the 1992–1993 series of GamesMaster, playing Mad Dog McCree winning her challenge.

== Philanthropy ==
In 2003, Lawrence spent eight months walking across China, Cuba, Peru and Tanzania for Breakthrough Breast Cancer and helped to raise over £550,000. She had to wear a knee brace throughout the trek because of damage to her anterior cruciate ligament.

In 2005, she climbed Mount Kilimanjaro for Sunfield, a school for children with autism and complex learning needs, of which she is a patron. On 21 April 2008, she hosted a VIP-night performance of Hapgood at The Birmingham Rep in aid of Sunfield and raised a further £3,500 for the charity. In 2009, Lawrence raised £25,000 for Sunfield by appearing on Who Wants to Be a Millionaire? with Meera Syal.

Lawrence and Shane Richie participated in the final leg of the celebrity Around the World in 80 Days challenge to raise money for Children in Need 2009. They travelled from Memphis to Wilmington, North Carolina and then to London over 15 days.

== Personal life ==
Lawrence is single. In an interview with Jim Sweeney, she said of being asked why she is unmarried, "It's always the same: 'You're 41 and not married and no kids.' God, I'm so bored with it." She resides in Hackney, London. She has two cats, a long-haired ginger (Aynuk) and a black-and-white (Ayli), named after the Black Country characters Aynuk and Ayli, who feature prominently in jokes about Black Country dialect. As a guest on QI she named David Attenborough her "God".

== Honours ==
In 1994, Lawrence was awarded an honorary doctorate by Dartington College of Arts, and she has since been awarded two more, an honorary doctorate of letters from the University of Wolverhampton in 2004 and in 2006 a doctorate by Aston University for "services to the entertainment industry."

Sandwell Council named one of their road gritting trucks "Frozie Lawrence" in her honour.

== Filmography ==
Year	Film	Role	Notes
1979	A Christmas Carol at Ford's Theatre	Mrs. Dilber/Fred's Younger Sister/Shopper No. 2	TV movie
1985	Summer Season	Rachel	TV series (1 episode: "Rachel and the Roarettes")
1986	The American Way	Guerillette	
1987	Comedy Wavelength		TV series (1 episode: "Episode #1.5")
1988	Campaign	Linda Prentice	TV series (4 episodes)
1988	Get Fresh	Presenter – Get The Joke	TV series (21 episodes)
1989	Agatha Christie's Poirot	Ernestine Grant	TV series (1 episode: "The Third Floor Flat")
1989	Norbert Smith: A Life	Ruby Lawrence	TV movie
1989	Alas Smith and Jones		TV series (1 episode: "The Untreated Version")
1990	Not with a Bang	Janet Wilkins	TV series (7 episodes)
1990	The Green Man	Lucy	TV series (3 episodes)
1990	Jackson Pace: The Great Years	Ryveeta Tusk	TV series (6 episodes)
1991	Enchanted April	Lottie Wilkins	
1992	A Word in Your Era	Cleopatra	TV series (1 episode: "Episode #1.7")
1993	The Comic Strip Presents...	Susie	TV series (1 episode: "Queen of the Wild Frontier")
1994	The World of Peter Rabbit and Friends	Pigwig	TV series (1 episode: "The Tale of Pigling Bland")
1994	Downwardly Mobile	Sophie	TV series (7 episodes)
1994	Outside Edge	Maggie Costello	TV series (22 episodes: 1994–1996); Nominated — Best TV Comedy Actress
1995	Absolutely Fabulous	Cable TV Presenter	TV series (1 episode: "The End")
1995	Gogs		TV series (2 episodes: 1995–1996)
1995	Spot's Magical Christmas	Sally/Helen	Direct-to-video special
1996	Paul Merton in Galton and Simpson's...	Primrose/Sarah Tiptree	TV series (2 episodes: 1996–1997)
1996	The Adventures of Dawdle the Donkey	Dawdle	TV series (20 episodes: 1996–1997)
1997	The Sin Eater	Kate	TV Short
1997	Spot and His Grandparents Go to the Carnival	Sally/Helen	Direct-to-video special
1998	Star Hill Ponies	Various Characters	TV series
1998	Bill's New Frock	Bill's Mum	Short
1998	Duck Patrol	Shemerlda	TV series (2 episodes)
1998	Oi! Get Off Our Train	Mum/ Crane	Voice
1999	Dog and Duck	Duck	Voice
1999	The Flint Street Nativity	Debbie Bennett/Mary	TV movie
2000	Gogwana	Voice	TV Short
2000	Married 2 Malcolm	Natalie	
2000	A Many Splintered Thing	Camilla	TV series (6 episodes)
2000	Fat Friends	Julia Fleshman	TV series (8 episodes: 2000–2002)
2003	Keen Eddie	Liese Kohl	TV series (1 episode: "Achtung, Baby")
2003	Where the Heart Is	Rita Shepherd	TV series (1 episode: "A Time to Dance")
2004	Holby City	Avril Coulter	TV series (1 episode: "Out of Control")
2005	Down to Earth	Shirley Potts	TV series (1 episode: "Trouble 'n' Strife")
2006	Agatha Christie's Marple	Hannah Beresford	TV series (1 episode: "By the Pricking of My Thumbs")
2006	Acorn Antiques the Musical: Triplet Trauma	Bonnie	Video Short
2006	Acorn Antiques the Musical: Mrs Overall's Return	Bonnie	Video Short
2006	Acorn Antiques: The Musical!	Donna/Bonnie	Video
2006	The Complete Guide to Parenting	Phoebe Huntley	TV series (5 episodes)
2007	The Last Detective	Gillian Langham	TV series (1 episode: "The Man from Montevideo")
2007	Robin Hood	Matilda	TV series (1 episode: "Ducking and Diving")
2007	The Old Curiosity Shop	Mrs. Jiniwin	TV movie
2007	Skins	Liz Jenkins	TV series (3 episodes: 2007–2008)
2009	Minder	Delilah Daley	TV series (1 episode: "Till Debt Do Us Part")
2009	Eastenders	Manda Best	TV series (49 episodes: 2009–2010)
2010	Round Ireland with a Fridge	Sandra	
2010	Casualty	Janet Haines	TV series (1 episode: "Chaos Theory")
2010	Handle with Care	Karen	Short
2010	The Fridge Interviews	The Lady Fridge	Short
2010	Mam	Reenie	Short
2010	Doctors	Cathy Dayman/Katrina Kidd/Susie Vine	TV series (3 episodes: 2010–2014)
2013	Common Ground	Fiona	TV series (1 episode: "Rupert")
2013	No Prisoners	Louise	Short
2013	Wizards vs Aliens	Madeline Raven	TV series (2 episodes: "The Curse of Crowe", parts 1 & 2)
2014	Bonobo	Anita	
2014	Jonathan Creek	Denise	TV series (1 episode: "The Curse of the Bronze Lamp")
2014	Looking for Vi	Evelyn Hawthorne/Vi Cardle	Short
2015	The Kennedys	Miss Parsons	TV series (1 episode: "Valentine")
2016	Humans	Barbara	TV series (2 episodes)
2016	Stella	Val	TV series (1 episode: "Christmas Special")
2018	Finding Your Feet	Pamela	
2019	Good Omens	Agnes Nutter	TV series
2020	Shakespeare & Hathaway: Private Investigators	Dr. Helen Middleton	TV series (1 episode: "Thy Fury Spent")
2023	Midsomer Murders	Prof. Lorna McIntosh	TV series (1 episode: "Claws Out")
2024	Father Brown	Christine Kipley	TV series (1 episode: "The Dead of Night")
2025	Death in Paradise	Marjorie Dodds	TV series (1 episode: Christmas Special 2025)
2026	Mother's Pride	Edith	
2026	The Chelsea Detective	India Varstone	TV series (1 episode 'The Petrov Extension')

== Appearances ==
Year	Film	Role	Notes
1988	Friday Night Live	Herself/Various	TV series
1988	Whose Line Is It Anyway?	Herself	TV series (53 episodes: 1988–1997)
1989	Hysteria 2!	Herself	TV special
1989	Agatha Christie's Poirot	Mrs Grant	TV series (1 episode: "The Third Floor Flat")
1989	The South Bank Show	Rachel	TV series documentary (1 episode: "Ben Elton")
1989	A Night of Comic Relief 2	Herself	TV special
1991	Aspel & Company	Herself	TV series (1 episode: "Episode #8.12")
1991	Josie	Herself/Various	TV series (6 episodes)
1991	Forty Minutes	Narrator	TV series documentary (1 episode: "Boob in Toyland")
1993	Gamesmaster	Herself	TV series (1 episode: "Episode #2.22")
1993	Arena	T (voice)	TV series (1 episode: "Radio Night")
1994	Paul Merton's Palladium Story	Game Show Contestant Mrs. Simpson	TV mini-series documentary (1 episode: "Act Two: The Television Years")
1994	An Audience with Ken Dodd	Herself	TV special
1996	Happy Birthday Shirley	Herself	TV movie (uncredited)
1999	Never Mind the Buzzcocks	Herself	TV series (1 episode: "Episode #5.8")
1999	American version of Whose Line Is It Anyway?	Herself	TV series (2 episodes)
2001	The Lesley Garrett Show	Herself	TV series (1 episode: "Notes from the Heart")
2002	A Week in the West End	Herself	TV series (1 episode: "Episode #1.5")
2003	Kelly	Herself	TV series (1 episode: "21 March 2003")
2003	Today with Des and Mel	Herself	TV series (1 episode: "4 December 2003")
2003	Loose Women	Herself	TV series (2 episodes: 2003–2004)
2004	QI	Herself	TV series (1 episode: "Bats")
2005	The Wright Stuff	Guest Panelist/Herself	TV series (2 episodes: 2005–2012)
2008	The Big Questions	Herself	TV series (1 episode: "Episode #1.16")
2009	Who Wants to Be a Millionaire?	Herself	TV series (1 episode: "31 January 2009")
2009	The Paul O'Grady Show	Herself	TV series (1 episode: "13 March 2009")
2009	Around the World in 80 Days	Herself	TV mini-series (2 episodes)
2010	The Sweeney: The Life and Work of Jim Sweeney	Herself	documentary
2010	The Story Behind the Fridge	Herself	video documentary short
2011	24 Hour Panel People	Herself	TV mini-series (1 episode: "Episode #1.5")
2012	Just a Minute	Herself	Radio series (1 episode: "Episode #1.5")
2012	Would I Lie to You?	Herself	TV series (1 episode: "Episode #6.7")
2012	BBC Proms	Herself	TV series (1 episode: "Prom 48: Weber, Mahler & Tchaikovsky")
