= Urban Hymn =

- Theatrical release poster
- Directed by: Michael Caton-Jones
- Written by: Nick Moorcroft
- Produced by: John Sachs; Andrew Berg; Neil Chordia
- Starring: Letitia Wright; Shirley Henderson; Isabella Laughland; Ian Hart; Steven Mackintosh
- Cinematography: Denis Crossan
- Edited by: István Király
- Music by: Tom Linden
- Production companies: Dashisha Global Film Production and Eclipse Films in association with Powderkeg Pictures
- Distributed by: Bulldog Film Distribution
- Release date: 11 September 2015 (TIFF)
- Running time: 114 minutes
- Country: United Kingdom
- Language: English
- Budget: £2 million

Urban Hymn is a 2015 British coming-of-age drama directed by Michael Caton-Jones, written by Nick Moorcroft, starring Letitia Wright, Shirley Henderson, Isabella Laughland, Ian Hart, and Steven Mackintosh.

== Premise ==
Set against the backdrop of the 2011 England riots, the film follows a neglected and volatile female offender, Jamie, who possesses an amazing singing voice and is torn between her loyalties toward her inspiring, unconventional care worker, Kate, and her possessive and volatile best friend, Leanne.

== Cast ==
- Letitia Wright as Jamie Harrison
- Shirley Henderson as Kate Linton
- Isabella Laughland as Leanne Dixon
- Steven Mackintosh as David Linton
- Ian Hart as Ian Wilson
- Billy Bragg as himself
- Shaun Parkes as Charlie
- Caroline O'Neill as Fiona
- Frankie Oatway as Bob
- Matthew Steer as Michael
- Jack McMullen as Dean
- David McKell as Ryan
- Victoria Alcock as Prison Chaplain

== Production ==
On 7 July 2014, Dashishah Global Film Production and Eclipse Films in association with Powderkeg Pictures announced that Caton-Jones would direct the film with Shirley Henderson starring opposite 2012 Screen International Star of Tomorrow, Letitia Wright. Principal photography commenced on 22 September 2014 with filming taking place in Richmond, Twickenham, Morden and former HMP prison Latchmere House in South-East London. Dashishah fully financed the production through their film production company which is based in Geneva, Switzerland. The film wrapped shooting on 23 October 2014 after a rigorous 28-day schedule, filming upwards of 13 scenes a day. The semi-autobiographical film was based upon Nick Moorcroft's formative years growing up in Essex. Billy Bragg's initiative, Jail Guitar Doors, which donates guitars to prison inmates also features in the film.

== Release ==
The film was selected for the 2015 Toronto International Film Festival in September 2016, and received its world premiere in the 'City To City' section. Urban Hymn was also officially selected for the Busan International Film Festival, Asia's largest film festival held in South Korea in October 2015. On 19 February 2016 the Glasgow Film Festival held a gala screening for the film where it was hailed as a powerful social realist drama and resulted in many favourable reviews. The film was selected for the 46th edition of the Giffoni film festival held in Italy and screened in the Generator +18 section on 21 July 2016. On 25 July the festival jury awarded Urban Hymn the Gryphon Award for Best Film.

It was reported by Screen International at the 2016 Cannes Film Festival that Urban Hymn had been picked up for theatrical distribution in the U.K and Ireland in selected cinemas nationwide. The film was released in cinemas in U.K and Ireland on Friday 30 September 2016. Urban Hymn opened in select cinemas throughout the UK on 30 September 2016, to largely strong reviews. It currently holds a 60% Fresh rating on review site Rotten Tomatoes, based on 25 reviews. The film opened in select cinemas in America on 12 May 2017. It was New York Times critics pick of the week. The film has currently sold to 10 territories across the world, including Canada, Spain, Italy, Japan, Scandinavia, Turkey, South-Korea, Japan and North America.

The film was added to Netflix on 3 July 2017. It was announced in Variety that the film would also be available On Demand platforms including AT&T U-verse, Comcast, DirecTV, Spectrum, Amazon Instant, iTunes, Dish Network, Vubiquity and Vudu.

== Reception ==
The film holds a 58% "Rotten" score on review aggregator Rotten Tomatoes, based on 26 critic reviews with an average rating of 6.1/10. The website's critics consensus reads, "Urban Hymn follows a familiar outline, but does so with enough palpable feeling that it's easy to forgive the film's flaws." On Metacritic, which uses a weighted average, the film holds a score of 51/100, based on nine critics, indicating "mixed or average" reviews.

Toronto Film Festival Director, Piers Handling, called Urban Hymn "a searing and moving portrait of a pair of disenfranchised teen girls, grounded by a sharp script and sensitive, naturalistic actors". Evening Standard film critic David Sexton wrote "This film is a turning point for director Michael Caton-Jones" and "develops real power in the relationship between Jamie and Kate and it directly addresses the intractable problem of the dispossessed." The Guardian wrote that Urban Hymn was "Heart-warming social realism, with a great couple of lead performances (from Isabella Laughland and Letitia Wright)". Alan Hunter of Screen International reviewed the film favorably saying "The appeal of Urban Hymn lies in a heartrending, human story that is told with care and concern".

Stephen Dalton, from The Hollywood Reporter wrote it was "hugely refreshing to see a rare British movie whose key cast is almost entirely female, with a rising young black talent as the main star." The head of the Glasgow Film Festival stated that "Shirley Henderson gives one of the finest performances of her career as Kate in Urban Hymn". Italian Film Critic, Minerva Romana, awarded the film five stars at the Giffoni Film Festival where it won Best Film, hailing it as a beautiful and profound drama. Total Film and The Daily Express gave the film glowing 4 star reviews. Cassam Looch from Hey U Guys film website reviewed the film favorably calling it "One of the most beautiful, heartbreaking and tender films of the year". Mike McCahill of The Guardian awarded the film 3 stars calling it "a mixed bag, but one that comes good in its closing stretch, working its way towards a place of quiet power". The Los Angeles Times called it a "British Tear-jerker which hits all the high notes".

== Accolades ==
On 14 October 2016, Letitia Wright and Isabella Laughland were both longlisted for the British Independent Film Awards Most Promising Newcomer Award for their performances in Urban Hymn. On 21 October 2016, The Hollywood Reporter announced that Urban Hymn producers, John Sachs, Andrew Berg and Neil Chordia were longlisted for the 2016 Breakthrough Producer of The Year award for Urban Hymn. On 1 November 2016, Letitia Wright was nominated for the Most Promising Newcomer Award at the British Independent Film Awards. Soon after she was cast as Shuri in the Marvel Cinematic Universe films Black Panther and Avengers: Infinity War, both of which stand amongst the highest-grossing films of all time.

== Soundtrack ==
Sony Music released the original soundtrack on 28 October 2016.

No.	Title	Writer(s)	Performer(s)	Length
1.	"White Riot"	Joe Strummer Mick Jones	The Clash	2:40
2.	"Standing In the Right Place"	Belarus	Belarus	2:57
3.	"I Keep Faith"	Billy Bragg	Billy Bragg	4:16
4.	"Sinking to the Bottom"	Belarus	Belarus	3:02
5.	"Don't Break My Heart"	UB40	Urban Hymn Choir	3:01
6.	"Open the Door to Your Heart"	Donnie Elbert	Darrell Banks	3:41
7.	"Faithful"	Jamie Joseph	Jamie Joseph	3:04
8.	"You Forgot How To Love"	Patti LaBelle	Patti LaBelle & the BlueBelles	2:43
9.	"Standing In The Right Place"	Belarus	Letitia Wright & Urban Hymn Choir	3:44
10.	"Sinking To The Bottom Parts 1&2"	Belarus	Urban Hymn Choir	4:57
11.	"Reaction"	Belarus	Belarus	2:43
12.	"Feel"	Belarus	Urban Hymn Choir	3:07
13.	"Car Crash"	Belarus	Urban Hymn Choir	2:37
14.	"In The End It's Easy"	Belarus	Belarus	2:41
15.	"Shining Shore"	Belarus	Urban Hymn Choir	3:18
16.	"Feel"	Belarus	Belarus	4:53
17.	"Reaction"	Belarus	Urban Hymn Choir	2:42
18.	"What Are You?"	TZY	TZY FT Tinchy Stryder	2:24
19.	"Mash Up The Dance"	Linden & Valentine	Linden & Valentine Feat. Renee Alleyne	2:50
