= Dave Johns =

English comedian, actor, and writer

- Born: David Alan Johns; 15 July 1956 (age 70); Wallsend, England
- Occupations: Comedian, actor, writer
- Website: davejohns.net

David Alan Johns (born 15 July 1956) is an English stand-up comedian, actor, and writer. He is best known for his breakthrough role as Daniel Blake in the 2016 Ken Loach film I, Daniel Blake.

== Career ==
Johns has appeared on Never Mind the Buzzcocks (four times), 8 Out of 10 Cats, Rob Brydon's Annually Retentive, 28 Acts in 28 Minutes and, as an actor, he has appeared on Mud, Time Gentlemen Please, Inspector George Gently, and Harry Hill as God.

In 2009, he and Owen O'Neill dramatised Stephen King's Rita Hayworth and Shawshank Redemption for the Gaiety Theatre, Dublin.

In 2016, he starred as the title character in the Ken Loach film I, Daniel Blake in a critically acclaimed performance described as "powerful", "a welcome comic touch", and "all the more moving for its restraint". He later wrote a stage version of the film updated to the 2021/2022 cost of living crisis which premiered at the Northern Stage, Newcastle upon Tyne in May 2023.

Johns hosts “Desert Island Flicks” at the Tyneside Cinema in Newcastle where famous figures are invited to watch a film of their choice with an audience followed by a discussion and a question and answer session.

== Filmography ==
=== Film ===
Key
†	Denotes films that have not yet been released

Year	Title	Role	Notes
2016	I, Daniel Blake	Daniel	
2017	Howay!	Terry	Short film
2017	Me, the Elephant	Dad	Short film
2018	Walk Like a Panther	Trevor 'Bulldog' Bolton	
2019	The Keeper	Roberts	
2019	Fishermen's Friends	Leadville Trebilcock	
2020	23 Walks	Dave	
2020	Blithe Spirit	Harold	
2022	Fisherman's Friends: One and All	Leadville Trebilcock	
2022	Making Up	Ted Bickerstaff	
2023	Turtles (Les Tortues)	Thom Halford	
2026	Merry Christmas Aubrey Flint	Mr. Formby	

=== Television ===
Year	Title	Role	Notes
1995	Mud	Trev	Episode #2.1
1997	Rag Nymph	Man	Episode #1.1
1997	The Moth	Man	Uncredited; TV movie
1998	Harry Hill	God	Episodes #2.2, #2.7 & #2.8
1998	Colour Blind	Auctioneer	Episode #1.2; TV Mini-series
2001	Time Gentlemen Please	'Cheesy' Alan Supple	Episode: "New Year's Steve"
2006	Cattle Drive	The Burglar	Episode #1.1
2006	Dogtown	Norm	
2010	Inspector George Gently	Comedian	Episode: "Gently Evil"
2013	It's Kevin	Various	Episode #1.6
2017	The Nightly Show	Himself	1 episode
2025–	The Dumping Ground	Bernie	Series 13 Onwards

== Awards and nominations ==
Year	Award	Category	Title	Result	Ref
2016	British Independent Film Awards	Best Actor	I, Daniel Blake	Won	
2016	British Independent Film Awards	Most Promising Newcomer	I, Daniel Blake	Nominated	
2016	Dublin Film Critics Circle Awards	Best Actor	I, Daniel Blake	Won	
2016	European Film Awards	European Actor	I, Daniel Blake	Nominated	
2017	Empire Awards	Best Male Newcomer	I, Daniel Blake	Won	
2017	London Critics Circle Film Awards	British/Irish Actor of the Year	I, Daniel Blake	Nominated	
