= Entertainment Film Distributors =

British film distributor

Entertainment Film Distributors Limited
- Formerly: Rewbond Limited (1977–1978)
- Type: Private
- Industry: Film distribution
- Founded: 10 November 1977; 48 years ago
- Founder: Michael L. Green
- Headquarters: London, England
- Area served: United Kingdom; Ireland
- Products: Motion pictures
- Divisions: Entertainment in Video
- Website: www.entertainment-film.com

Entertainment Film Distributors Limited is a British distributor of independent films in the United Kingdom and Ireland. It was founded by Michael L. Green and is currently run by his son Nigel Green. The company has released many BAFTA and Oscar-winning films including The Departed, Million Dollar Baby, Gosford Park, Brokeback Mountain and The Artist.

== History ==
Michael L. Green was a veteran producer/distributor involved in the film industry since the 1930s when he was a teenager. In 1972, he founded Variety, a prolific film distributor. On 10 November 1977, Green closed Variety and with his two sons, Nigel and Trevor, formed Entertainment Film Distributors (and later its video arm, Entertainment in Video), which served as one of the leading forces in UK distribution. Michael L. Green died on 17 June 2003 at the age of 84 and Trevor Green died on 30 April 2020 at the age of 66.

Their first big success was Teen Wolf (1985) starring Michael J. Fox. Entertainment has released films for Empire Pictures and New World Pictures. Most notably, between 1990 and 2010, Entertainment distributed films made by New Line Cinema along with films from other independent production companies. One of the most notable series of films distributed to date is The Lord of the Rings trilogy. Beginning in 2008, Entertainment Film Distributors became The Weinstein Company's main United Kingdom distributor up until 2017, when the Harvey Weinstein scandal began. In 2010, distribution rights for New Line Cinema films in the UK and Ireland were folded into New Line's parent company Warner Bros. Pictures.

== Theatrical releases ==
=== 1970s ===
==== 1977 ====
- Black Samurai
- Desperate Living

==== 1978 ====
- Terror
- The Inglorious Bastards
- What's Up Superdoc!
- The Buddy Holly Story
- The Mountain of the Cannibal God
- Barracuda

==== 1979 ====
- Gambling City
- The Van
- Immoral Women
- Spree
- Malibu Beach

=== 1980s ===
==== 1980 ====
- Tarzoon: Shame of the Jungle
- Dracula Sucks

==== 1981 ====
- Polyester
- The Prowler

==== 1982 ====
- Island of Blood
- Tuxedo Warrior
- Day of the Animals
- Parasite
- Waitress!

==== 1983 ====
- Little Laura and Big John
- Starstruck
- Hysterical
- Zapped!
- The New Barbarians
- S.A.S. à San Salvador
- Funny Money

==== 1984 ====
- Hot Dog…The Movie
- Thunder Warrior
- Deadly Force
- Real Life
- Mutant
- A Matter of Time
- The King and the Mockingbird
- The Party Animal
- The Dungeonmaster
- Ghost Warrior
- Code Name: Wild Geese
- Trancers
- The Act

==== 1985 ====
- 1990: The Bronx Warriors
- Alphabet City
- Ghoulies
- Future-Kill
- Starchaser: The Legend of Orin
- Re-Animator
- Night of the Comet
- Teen Wolf
- Savage Island
- Commando Leopard
- The Adventures of Mark Twain
- Octavia
- Zone Troopers

==== 1986 ====
- House
- Troll
- The Adventures of the American Rabbit
- Eliminators
- Soldier's Revenge
- Godzilla 1985
- GoBots: Battle of the Rock Lords
- TerrorVision
- Deadtime Stories
- No Retreat, No Surrender
- Jake Speed
- Rainbow Brite and the Star Stealer
- Operation Nam
- The Falling
- Extremities
- The Men's Club
- Necropolis
- Sky Bandits
- Joysticks

==== 1987 ====
- Ricky 1
- Armed Response
- The Kindred
- Day of the Dead
- The Big Bang
- Modern Girls
- Destination America
- Wanted: Dead or Alive
- Mutant Hunt
- Enemy Territory
- Cyclone
- Hellraiser
- Near Dark
- Ghoulies II
- It Couldn't Happen Here
- No Retreat, No Surrender 2
- Flowers in the Attic
- Creepshow 2
- Prison
- Vamp

==== 1988 ====
- Mama Dracula
- Breeders
- Cop
- A Tiger's Tale
- Cellar Dweller
- The Commander
- Ghost Town
- Catacombs
- Rock & Rule
- Buy & Cell

==== 1989 ====
- Deep Space
- Survival Game
- The Lone Runner
- Slipstream
- Kansas
- Sonny Boy
- I, Madman
- Teen Witch
- 1969
- Curse II: The Bite
- The Curse
- Night Game
- Kickboxer
- The Return of the Musketeers
- Major League
- Puppet Master
- Arena
- Interzone
- The Wolves of Willoughby Chase

=== 1990s ===
==== 1990 ====
- Three Wishes
- Wired
- Buried Alive
- Shadowzone
- China O'Brien
- Clownhouse
- Best of the Best
- Cat Chaser
- Palais Royale
- Honeymoon Academy
- Meridian: Kiss of the Beast
- Night of the Cyclone
- Crash and Burn
- Creator
- Hope and Glory
- Dark Angel
- The Reflecting Skin
- Wild Orchid
- Pump Up the Volume
- The Garbage Pail Kids Movie
- The Lemon Sisters
- Why Me?
- Nightbreed
- Bad Influence
- Killer Instinct
- Puppet Master II
- Street Hunter
- Warm Summer Rain

==== 1991 ====
- The Pit and the Pendulum
- Kickboxer 2: The Road Back
- Men at Work
- Highlander II: The Quickening
- The Ambulance
- Wedlock
- Martial Law
- Cool Blue
- Mom
- Subspecies
- The Nutcracker Prince
- Twenty-One
- Trancers II
- Karate Cop

==== 1992 ====
- Riding the Edge
- By the Sword
- Suburban Commando
- Once Upon a Crime
- Demonic Toys
- Armour of God II: Operation Condor
- Kuffs
- Dollman
- Meet the Feebles
- At Play in the Fields of the Lord
- Think Big
- Until the End of the World
- Live Wire
- Split Second
- Jersey Girl
- The Princess and the Goblin
- Peter's Friends
- Into the West
- Traces of Red

==== 1993 ====
- Delta Heat
- Sidekicks
- Damage
- Wind
- Sniper
- Stalingrad
- Mr. Nanny
- Best of the Best II
- Ruby Cairo
- Surf Ninjas
- Excessive Force
- Shadow of the Wolf
- Boxing Helena
- Jailbait
- Super Mario Bros.
- Much Ado About Nothing
- The Piano
- American Heart
- Slaughter of the Innocents
- Weekend at Bernie's II

==== 1994 ====
- The Knife
- Hear No Evil
- Joshua Tree
- The Man Without a Face
- Tombstone
- Arcade
- Save Me
- Where the Rivers Flow North
- The House of the Spirits
- Against the Wall
- The Hit List
- Tom & Viv
- What's Eating Gilbert Grape
- The Crow
- Solar Crisis
- Staggered
- Roadflower
- Sugar Hill
- Watch It
- Airborne
- Once Were Warriors
- The Mask
- Bad Boy Bubby
- Monkey Trouble
- Rapa Nui
- Highlander III: The Sorcerer
- The Mighty Ducks
- A Feast at Midnight
- Princess Caraboo
- Solitaire for 2

==== 1995 ====
- Shrunken Heads
- Father and Scout
- Men of War
- The Road to Wellville
- Immortal Beloved
- Once Were Warriors
- Fresh
- Captives
- Don Juan DeMarco
- Death Machine
- Bank Robber
- The Maddening
- Surviving the Game
- Haunted
- In the Mouth of Madness
- Friday
- The City of Lost Children
- Mortal Kombat
- Living in Oblivion
- The Scarlet Letter
- Mad Dogs and Englishmen

==== 1996 ====
- No Exit
- Se7en
- Leaving Las Vegas
- Midnight Heat
- Bed of Roses
- Nixon
- First Strike
- Angus
- Up Close and Personal
- A Thin Line Between Love and Hate
- Kingpin
- The Substitute
- Castle Freak
- Theodore Rex
- Last Man Standing
- The Long Kiss Goodnight
- 2 Days in the Valley
- The Fan
- Evita
- Space Truckers
- The Island of Dr. Moreau
- Feeling Minnesota
- Twelfth Night
- Hard Men

==== 1997 ====
- Set It Off
- The Arrival
- Mother Night
- In Love and War
- The Evening Star
- Head of the Family
- Coyote Run
- Turbulence
- It Takes Two
- First Strike
- Shadow Conspiracy
- Shooting Fish
- Seven Years in Tibet
- Private Parts
- Vampire Journals
- Dangerous Ground
- Donnie Brasco
- Love! Valour! Compassion!
- Boogie Nights
- Gummo
- An American Werewolf in Paris
- Love Jones
- Trial and Error
- Preaching to the Perverted
- Spawn
- One Night Stand
- Photographing Fairies
- I Know What You Did Last Summer
- B.A.P.S.

==== 1998 ====
- Rush Hour
- Mortal Kombat Annihilation
- Wag the Dog
- Money Talks
- Wild Things
- Most Wanted
- Star Kid
- Dark City
- The Wedding Singer
- Lost in Space
- The Wisdom of Crocodiles
- Living Out Loud
- Killer Tongue
- Desperate Measures
- Up 'n' Under
- Deep Rising
- Mr. Nice Guy
- Woo
- The Players Club
- Blade
- All the Little Animals

==== 1999 ====
- Pleasantville
- American History X
- Blast from the Past
- Happiness
- Pecker
- The Corruptor
- You're Dead...
- Mad Cows
- This Year's Love
- Julian Po
- The Astronaut's Wife
- Ride with the Devil
- Austin Powers: The Spy Who Shagged Me
- Swing
- Detroit Rock City
- The Trench
- The Muse
- The Legend of 1900

=== 2000s ===
==== 2000 ====
- Rancid Aluminium (21 January)
- The Bachelor (18 February)
- Body Shots (18 February)
- Tumbleweeds (3 March)
- Next Friday (10 March)
- Magnolia (24 March)
- American Psycho (21 April)
- Final Destination (19 May)
- U-571 (2 June)
- Frequency (16 June)
- Love & Basketball (7 July)
- Complicity (10 July)
- Cherry Falls (25 August)
- The Luzhin Defence (8 September)
- The Cell (15 September)
- Bring It On (20 October)
- Little Nicky (17 November)
- The Family Man (22 December)

==== 2001 ====
- Lost Souls (12 January)
- Traffic (26 January)
- Dungeons & Dragons (7 February)
- 15 Minutes (23 March)
- Bamboozled (6 April)
- One Night at McCool's (20 April)
- Blow (25 May)
- Town & Country (29 June)
- Rush Hour 2 (3 August)
- The Anniversary Party (20 August)
- Hedwig and the Angry Inch (31 August)
- Mike Bassett: England Manager (28 September)
- The Man Who Wasn't There (26 October)
- Spy Game (23 November)
- Storytelling (30 November)
- The Lord of the Rings: The Fellowship of the Ring (14 December)
- The Invisible Circus

==== 2002 ====
- Gosford Park (1 February)
- Ali (22 February)
- Life as a House (15 March)
- Blade II (29 March)
- John Q. (26 April)
- Monster's Ball (7 June)
- Before You Go (21 June)
- Jason X (19 July)
- Austin Powers in Goldmember (26 July)
- Unconditional Love (23 August)
- My Big Fat Greek Wedding (20 September)
- Boat Trip (4 October)
- Simone (25 October)
- The Emperor's Club (22 November)
- The Lord of the Rings: The Two Towers (18 December)

==== 2003 ====
- Gangs of New York (9 January)
- About Schmidt (24 January)
- Final Destination 2 (7 February)
- Far from Heaven (7 March)
- A Man Apart (4 April)
- Ripley's Game (30 May)
- The Safety of Objects (15 August)
- Freddy vs. Jason (15 August)
- Underworld (19 September)
- Friday After Next (22 September)
- The Texas Chainsaw Massacre (31 October)
- Elf (28 November)
- Timeline (5 December)
- The Lord of the Rings: The Return of the King (17 December)

==== 2004 ====
- Charlie (6 February)
- Dawn of the Dead (26 March)
- The Reckoning (4 June)
- The Notebook (25 June)
- Around the World in 80 Days (9 July)
- Cellular (24 September)
- Saw (1 October)
- Boo, Zino & the Snurks (15 October)
- Fat Slags (15 October)
- Birth (5 November)
- Ladies in Lavender (12 November)
- After the Sunset (19 November)
- Beyond the Sea (26 November)
- Blade: Trinity (8 December)
- The Phantom of the Opera (10 December)

==== 2005 ====
- White Noise (7 January)
- Million Dollar Baby (14 January)
- Assault on Precinct 13 (28 January)
- The Sea Inside (11 February)
- Son of the Mask (11 February)
- In Good Company (18 February)
- Hotel Rwanda (25 February)
- Hostage (11 March)
- Valiant (25 March)
- The Wedding Date (22 April)
- A Dirty Shame (29 April)
- Monster-in-Law (13 May)
- Wedding Crashers (14 July)
- The Cave (26 August)
- The Man (9 September)
- A History of Violence (30 September)
- Domino (14 October)
- Dreamer (21 October)
- Saw II (28 October)
- The Libertine (18 November)
- Keeping Mum (2 December)
- Lassie (16 December)

==== 2006 ====
- Brokeback Mountain (6 January)
- Running Scared (6 January)
- Underworld: Evolution (20 January)
- The New World (27 January)
- Final Destination 3 (10 February)
- Lucky Number Slevin (24 February)
- The Ballad of Jack and Rose (31 March)
- Basic Instinct 2 (31 March)
- She's the Man (7 April)
- Take the Lead (7 April)
- The Mistress of Spices (21 April)
- Slither (28 April)
- Stormbreaker (21 July)
- Snakes on a Plane (18 August)
- The Black Dahlia (15 September)
- The Departed (6 October)
- The Texas Chainsaw Massacre: The Beginning (13 October)
- Little Children (3 November)
- Tenacious D in The Pick of Destiny (24 November)
- The Nativity Story (8 December)

==== 2007 ====
- White Noise 2: The Light (5 January)
- Blood and Chocolate (9 February)
- Because I Said So (16 February)
- The Number 23 (23 February)
- Fur (16 March)
- Premonition (16 March)
- The Last Mimzy (30 March)
- Fracture (20 April)
- Next (27 April)
- Goya's Ghosts (4 May)
- Hairspray (20 July)
- Lonely Hearts (27 July)
- Rush Hour 3 (10 August)
- Death Sentence (31 August)
- Run Fatboy Run (7 September)
- Shoot 'Em Up (14 September)
- Mr. Woodcock (28 September)
- Feast of Love (5 October)
- Rendition (19 October)
- Silk (9 November)
- August Rush (23 November)
- The Golden Compass (5 December)
- St Trinian's (21 December)

==== 2008 ====
- Before the Devil Knows You're Dead (11 January)
- Over Her Dead Body (1 February)
- Semi-Pro (29 February)
- Pathology (11 April)
- Deception (25 April)
- Sex and the City (28 May)
- Harold & Kumar Escape from Guantanamo Bay (30 May)
- Journey to the Center of the Earth (11 July)
- Space Chimps (1 August)
- Elegy (8 August)
- Bangkok Dangerous (5 September)
- The Women (12 September)
- Appaloosa (26 September)
- City of Ember (10 August)
- Mutant Chronicles (10 October)
- Pride and Glory (7 November)
- Zack and Miri Make a Porno (14 November)
- Four Christmases (26 November)
- Inkheart (12 December)
- A Bunch of Amateurs (19 December)

==== 2009 ====
- The Reader (2 January)
- Underworld: Rise of the Lycans (23 January)
- He's Just Not That Into You (6 February)
- New in Town (27 February)
- The Haunting in Connecticut (27 March)
- 17 Again (10 April)
- Ghosts of Girlfriends Past (1 May)
- Red Cliff (12 June)
- My Sister's Keeper (26 June)
- The Informers (17 July)
- Crossing Over (31 July)
- The Time Traveler's Wife (14 August)
- The Final Destination (28 August)
- Fame (25 September)
- Beyond a Reasonable Doubt (2 October)
- Halloween II (9 October)
- The Fourth Kind (6 November)
- Gamer (25 November)
- Nine (25 November)
- Planet 51 (4 December)
- St Trinian's 2: The Legend of Fritton's Gold (18 December)

=== 2010s ===
==== 2010 ====
- Sex & Drugs & Rock & Roll (8 January)
- The Book of Eli (15 January)
- Solomon Kane (19 February)
- Hachi: A Dog's Tale (12 March)
- Space Chimps 2: Zartog Strikes Back (28 May)
- Wild Target (18 June)
- Piranha 3D (20 August)
- Burke & Hare (29 October)
- London Boulevard (26 November)
- The Warrior's Way (3 December)
- Animals United (17 December)
- Arthur and the Great Adventure (24 December)

==== 2011 ====
- Henry's Crime (January 14)
- A Little Bit of Heaven (4 February)
- The Lincoln Lawyer (18 March)
- Scream 4 (15 April)
- Something Borrowed (6 May)
- The Inbetweeners Movie (19 August)
- Spy Kids: All the Time in the World (19 August)
- Apollo 18 (2 September)
- Colombiana (9 September)
- Killer Elite (23 September)
- Shark Night (30 September)
- Texas Killing Fields (14 October)
- The Rum Diary (11 November)
- My Week with Marilyn (25 November)
- Hugo (2 December)
- I Don't Know How She Does It (16 December)
- The Lady (26 December)
- The Artist (30 December)

==== 2012 ====
- Underworld: Awakening (20 January)
- The Grey (27 January)
- One for the Money (24 February)
- Gone (20 April)
- Lockout (20 April)
- Piranha 3DD (11 May)
- The Wedding Video (17 August)
- Dredd (7 September)
- Killing Them Softly (21 September)
- Untouchable (21 September)
- The Master (2 November)
- Love Bite (9 November)
- Silver Linings Playbook (23 November)
- Alex Cross (30 November)

==== 2013 ====
- Beautiful Creatures (13 February)
- The Host (29 March)
- Scary Movie 5 (12 April)
- Stand Up Guys (28 June)
- Chasing Mavericks (5 July)
- Sunshine on Leith (4 October)
- Romeo & Juliet (11 October)
- One Chance (25 October)
- The Butler (15 November)
- American Hustle (20 December)
- The Harry Hill Movie (20 December)

==== 2014 ====
- August: Osage County (24 January)
- I, Frankenstein (29 January)
- Her (14 February)
- Escape from Planet Earth (7 March)
- Transcendence (25 April)
- Devil's Knot (13 June)
- Seve (27 June)
- The Inbetweeners 2 (6 August)
- The Giver (19 September)
- The Necessary Death of Charlie Countryman (31 October)
- St. Vincent (5 December)
- Big Eyes (26 December)

==== 2015 ====
- Woman in Gold (10 April)
- The Age of Adaline (8 May)
- Knock Knock (26 June)
- Self/less (17 July)
- Southpaw (24 July)
- The Bad Education Movie (21 August)
- American Ultra (4 September)
- Solace (25 September)
- Regression (9 October)
- Burnt (6 November)
- The Dressmaker (20 November)

==== 2016 ====
- The Hateful Eight (8 January)
- The Boy (18 March)
- Hardcore Henry (8 April)
- Bad Moms (26 August)
- American Pastoral (11 November)

==== 2017 ====
- The Bye Bye Man (13 January)
- Lion (20 January)
- The Space Between Us (10 February)
- Colossal (19 May)
- Overdrive (11 August)
- A Bad Moms Christmas (1 November)

==== 2018 ====
- Hostiles (5 January)
- 12 Strong (26 January)
- Status Update (9 February)
- Duck Duck Goose (30 March)
- Hereditary (14 June)
- The More You Ignore Me (6 July)
- The Festival (17 August)
- Tulip Fever (7 December)

==== 2019 ====
- Fisherman's Friends (15 March)
- The Corrupted (10 May)
- Midsommar (5 July)
- The Current War (26 July)
- The Farewell (20 September)

=== 2020s ===
==== 2020 ====
- The Gentlemen (3 January)
- Brahms: The Boy II (21 February)

==== 2021 ====
- The Green Knight (24 September)
- C'mon C'mon (3 December)

==== 2022 ====
- Moonfall (4 February)
- Dog (18 February)
- X (18 March)
- Men (3 June)
- Fisherman's Friends: One and All (19 August)
- Three Thousand Years of Longing (2 September)

==== 2023 ====
- The Three Musketeers: D'Artagnan (21 April)
- Dream Scenario (10 November)
- The Three Musketeers: Milady (15 December)

==== 2024 ====
- Seize Them! (5 April)
- Civil War (12 April)
- The Crow (23 August)
- Megalopolis (27 September)
- Heretic (1 November)
- Better Man (27 December)

==== 2025 ====
- Babygirl (10 January)
- Last Breath (14 March)
- Death of a Unicorn (4 April)
- Clown in a Cornfield (6 June)
- The Legend of Ochi (1 August)
- Together (15 August)
- The Smashing Machine (3 October)
- Fackham Hall (12 December)
- Marty Supreme (26 December)

=== 2026 ===
- Return to Silent Hill (23 January)
- Good Luck, Have Fun, Don't Die (20 February)
- Mother's Pride (6 March)
- The Magic Faraway Tree (27 March)
- The Drama (3 April)
- De Gaulle: Résistance (28 August)
- Runner (11 September)
- De Gaulle: Liberté (18 September)
- The Uprising (9 October)
- I Play Rocky (6 November)

=== 2027 ===
- Babies (19 February)

=== TBA ===
- Cliffhanger
- Scandalous!
- St Trinian's 3: Battle of the Sexes
- Unbound Captives
