= David Hayman =

Scottish actor and director

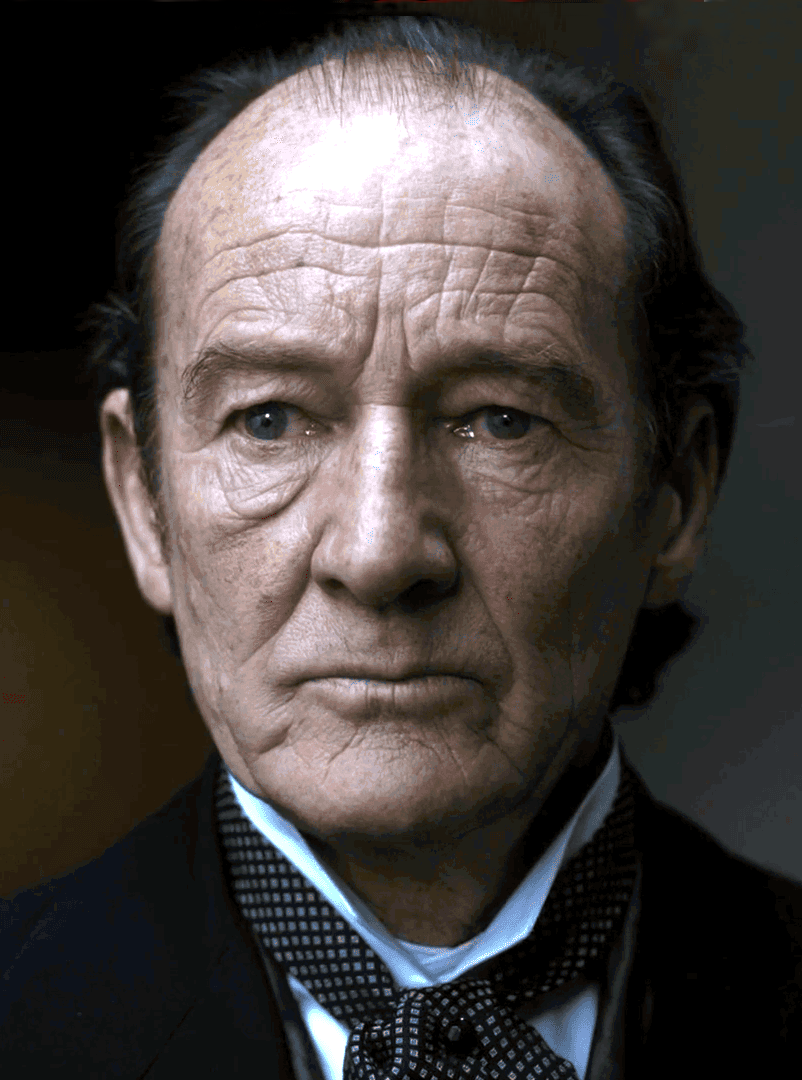
- Hayman in The Paradise, 2012
- Born: 9 February 1948 (age 78); Glasgow, Scotland
- Education: Royal Scottish Academy of Music and Drama
- Occupations: Actor; director

David Hayman (born 9 February 1948) is a Scottish film, television and stage actor and director from Glasgow. His acting credits include Sid and Nancy (1986), Hope and Glory (1987), Rob Roy (1995), The Jackal (1997), Trial & Retribution (1997–2009), Legionnaire (1998), Ordinary Decent Criminal (2000), Vertical Limit (2000), The Tailor of Panama (2001), Flood (2007), The Boy in the Striped Pyjamas (2008), The Paradise (2012), Taboo (2017), Our Ladies (2019), The Nest (2020), Bull (2021) and Andor (2022).

== Early life ==
Hayman was born in Glasgow. At the age of six, his family were relocated to Drumchapel, Glasgow. He had a happy upbringing in Drumchapel, nearer to the countryside, as part of a working class family with three children.

He left school at 16 years of age without any academic qualifications, but like his father, secured a job in the shipyards as an apprentice electrician. Despite having no family history of acting, he heeded advice from a local amateur dramatics group to apply for a position at the Royal Scottish Academy of Music and Drama (now Royal Conservatoire of Scotland) in Glasgow. After work one day, he stepped off the bus and headed to the academy in his boiler suit, despite normally being very shy, and enrolled.

== Career ==
He began his acting career at the Citizens Theatre in the city. At the venue, Hayman played roles such as Hamlet, the lead in the Beaumarchais directed plays, The Marriage of Figaro, and Al Capone. On television, he gained national prominence playing the role of the notorious Barlinnie Prison convict turned sculptor, Jimmy Boyle, in the tv movie A Sense of Freedom (1981). He also made uncredited appearances in early episodes of the comedy sketch show Scotch and Wry (1978).

After this film for television, Hayman focused on performing character roles rather than the lead. His long list of film credits include appearances supporting Gary Oldman in Sid and Nancy (1986), Bruce Willis in The Jackal (1997), Kevin Spacey in Ordinary Decent Criminal (2000) and Pierce Brosnan in The Tailor of Panama (2001). He also appeared in Hope and Glory (1987), directed by John Boorman, as well as The Boy in the Striped Pyjamas (2008).

Hayman is known for his role as Chief Supt. Michael Walker in Lynda La Plante's long-running crime thriller Trial & Retribution, which ran for twelve series from 1997 to 2009. He has a distinct scar over his left eye, which he chose to use as character makeup, along with a shaved head, for his part in the series.

Hayman has also had success in directing film and TV productions. Silent Scream (1990), is a study of convicts in Barlinnie Prison, examining the life of convicted murderer Larry Winters. The film was entered into the 40th Berlin International Film Festival. Later followed The Hawk (1993), starring Helen Mirren as a woman who begins to suspect that her husband is a serial killer. He was also in The Near Room, a film about child abuse and corruption set in Glasgow. A talk on the industry given by Hayman to pupils at James McAvoy's Glasgow school in the 1990s was referenced by the latter as the inception of his own successful acting career.

In 2009, Hayman appeared in an episode of the BBC series Robin Hood. In September 2011, Hayman hosted a documentary reconstructing the unsolved murders of Glasgow serial killer Bible John, who murdered three young women in the late 1960s. The documentary was named In Search of Bible John, and looked at the evidence which links Peter Tobin to the killings.

In 2012, Hayman played the Earl of Worcester in the BBC2 adaptation of Henry IV, Part I.

On stage, Hayman appeared as Chris in the 2011 production of Eugene O'Neill's Anna Christie at the Donmar Theatre, London. In 2012, he returned to the Citizens Theatre in Glasgow to play the lead in King Lear alongside George Costigan.

In March 2014, Hayman presented a BBC Two documentary exploring how shipbuilding industry along the river Clyde and four resulting ships; Cutty Sark, CS Mackay-Bennett, CSS Robert E. Lee and HMS Hood helped shaped up the Commonwealth. In July 2016, Hayman presented a BBC Two documentary highlighting Scapa Flow's key role in World War I.

In November 2018, Hayman presented a BBC One documentary telling the story of Captain Jack McCleery and his role, alongside his colleagues, in pioneering Royal Navy's naval aviation with their trial flight on HMS Furious and the subsequent Tondern raid. In 2019, he appeared in the Scottish film Our Ladies (2019), alongside Marli Siu.

In 2021, he starred in the British crime movie Bull (2021), alongside Neil Maskell. The same year, he presented Wonders of Scotland with David Hayman (documentary series) (2021) on ITV.

=== Charity work and awards ===
In 1992, Hayman was awarded the Glasgow Lord Provost's award for outstanding services to the performing arts. In 2001 he founded the humanitarian charity Spirit Aid which is dedicated to children of the world whose lives have been devastated by war, genocide, poverty, abuse or lack of opportunity. Hayman is currently Head of Operations of the charity which undertakes humanitarian relief projects from Kosovo to Palestine, Guinea-Bissau, Afghanistan, Sri Lanka, Cambodia, Malawi and South Africa.

=== Personal life ===
David Hayman has three sons, including David Jr..

== Theatre ==
Year	Title	Role	Company	Director	Notes
2011	Anna Christie	Chris	Donmar Theatre, London	Michael Grandage	play by Eugene O'Neill
2012	King Lear	King Lear	Citizens Theatre, Glasgow	Dominic Hill	play by William Shakespeare
2023	Cyprus Avenue	Eric	Tron Theatre, Glasgow	Andy Arnold	play by David Ireland
2025	Death of a Salesman	Willy Loman	Trafalgar Theatre	Andy Arnold	play by Arthur Miller

== Filmography ==
=== Acting ===
- Just Your Luck (1972, TV Series) as Alec
- Axe (1974) as Radio and Television Shows (voice)
- The Eagle of the Ninth (1977, TV mini-series) as Liathan
- Scotch & Wry (1978, TV series)
- Time of the Eagle (1979)
- A Sense of Freedom (1979) as Jimmy Boyle
- Enemy at the Door (1980, TV series) as Oberleutnant Hellman
- Eye of the Needle (1981) as Canter
- Ill Fares The Land (1982)
- Fame Is the Spur (1982, TV mini-series) as Arnold Ryerson
- Coming Out of the Ice (1982, TV movie) as Guard Commander 1
- Love Story: Mr. Right (1983, TV series)
- It'll All Be Over in Half an Hour (1983, TV series)
- Reilly: The Ace of Spies (1983, TV mini-series) as Von Jaegar
- Fell Tiger (1985, TV mini-series) as Joe Borrow
- Murphy's Law (1986) as Jack
- Sid and Nancy (1986) as Malcolm McLaren
- Heavenly Pursuits (1986) as Jeff Jeffries
- Hope and Glory (1987) as Clive
- Walker (1987) as Father Rossiter
- Venus Peter (1989) as Kinnear
- Silent Scream (1990) as PO 4 – Barlinnie Prison Staff
- Grave Secrets: The Legacy of Hilltop Drive (1992, TV movie) as Plumber
- Underbelly (1992, TV series) as Stephen Crowe
- Between the Lines (1993, TV series) as David Lindsay
- Finney (1994, TV series) as McDade
- Ghosts (1995, TV series) as Les Rudkin
- Rob Roy (1995) as Sibbald
- The Near Room (1995) as Dougie Patterson
- The Short Walk (1995, short) as Captain
- Smilla's Sense of Snow (1997) as Telling
- Twin Town (1997) as Dodgy
- Regeneration (1997) as Maj. Bryce
- The Jackal (1997) as Terek Murad
- The Boxer (1997) as Joe Hamill's Aide
- Friendly Voices (1997, Short) as Alec
- Trial & Retribution (1997–2009, TV series) as Det. Supt. (later Det. Ch. Supt.) Michael Walker
- Getting Hurt (1998, TV movie) as Corvin
- My Name Is Joe (1998) as McGowan
- Legionnaire (1998) as Recruiting Sergeant
- The Lost Son (1999) as Nathalie's Pimp
- The Match (1999) as Scrapper
- Ordinary Decent Criminal (2000) as Tony Brady
- Last Orders (2000, short)
- Best (2000) as Tommy Dougherty / The Barman
- Vertical Limit (2000) as Frank 'Chainsaw' Williams
- The Tailor of Panama (2001) as Luxmore
- Murder Rooms: The Photographer's Chair (2001, TV mini-series) as Mitchell
- The Last Great Wilderness (2002) as Ruaridh
- As the Beast Sleeps (2002, TV movie) as Alec
- The Wild Dogs (2002) as Victor
- Tough Love (2002, TV movie) as Barry Hindes
- Still Game (2002, TV series) as Vince
- Gifted (2003, TV movie) as Michael Sanderson
- De drabbade (2003, TV mini-series) as Häxjägaren
- Gladiatress (2004) as General Rhinus
- Fuse (2004, short) as Lem
- Where the Truth Lies (2005) as Reuben
- Rag Tale (2005) as Picture Editor – The Rag, Geoff (P3) Randal
- A Shot in the West (2006, short) as Henry Wynn
- Small Engine Repair (2006) as Jesse Gold
- Speed Dating (2007) as Doctor Birmingham
- Flood (2007) as Major General Ashcroft
- Unknown Things (2007) as Dr MacGregor
- The Boy in the Striped Pyjamas (2008) as Pavel
- The Promise (2008)
- Wasted (2009, TV series) as Joe
- Lewis (2009, TV series) as Richie Maguire
- Robin Hood (2009, TV series) as Abbott
- Burke & Hare (2010) as Danny McTavish
- Screwed (2011) as Keenan
- Birthday (2011) as Prison Warden
- Top Boy (2011–2013, TV series) as Joe
- In Search of Bible John (September 2011, TV series)
- Sawney: Flesh of Man (2012) as Sawney Bean
- The Domino Effect (2012) as Robert
- Henry IV, Part I (2012, TV series)
- The Paradise (2012–2013, TV series) as Jonas Franks
- The Field of Blood (2013, TV series) as Red Willie McDade
- Jack Ryan: Shadow Recruit (2014) as Ambassador Sergey Dostal
- Shetland (2014, TV series) TV as Joe Dalhousie
- Queen and Country (2014) as Clive Rohan
- Castles in the Sky (2014) as Frederick Lindemann
- New Tricks (2014, TV series) as Ralph Paxton
- Macbeth (2015) as Lennox
- Dartmoor Killing (2015) as Tom
- Viceroy's House (2017) as Ewart
- Taboo (2017, TV series) as Brace
- Finding Your Feet (2017) as Ted
- Two Graves (2018) as Tommy
- The Break (2018)
- Dirt Road to Lafayette (2018) as Uncle John
- Blinded by the Light (2019) as Mr Evans
- Fisherman's Friends (2019) as Jago
- The Corrupted (2019) as DCI Raymond Ellery
- Dad's Army: The Lost Episodes (2019, TV series) as Private Frazer
- Our Ladies (2019)
- The Nest (2020) as Souter
- Bull (2021) as Norm
- Landscapers (2021) as William Wycherley
- Doc Martin (2022) as George
- Fisherman's Friends: One and All (2022) as Jago
- Andor (2022) as Chieftain
- The Walk-In (2022) as Older Lenny
- My Neighbor Adolf (2022) as Mr. Polsky
- Raging Grace (2023) as Mr. Garrett
- Son of a Critch (2024) as Leo Critch
- Protection (2024, TV series) as Sid Nyles

=== Directing ===
- Silent Scream (1990)
- Firm Friends (1992) TV
- Black and Blue (1992) TV
- A Woman's Guide to Adultery (1993) TV
- The Hawk (1993)
- Cardiac Arrest (1994) TV
- Finney (1994) TV
- The Near Room (1995)
- Harbour Lights (1999) TV

=== Presenter ===
- Clydebuilt: The Ships That Made The Commonwealth (documentary series) (2014) TV
- Scotland's War at Sea (documentary series) (2016) TV
- The Battle for Scotland's Countryside (documentary) (2018) TV
- Hayman's Way (documentary series) (2020) TV
- Wonders of Scotland with David Hayman (documentary series) (2021) TV
