= 2009 WhatsOnStage Awards =

British theatre awards

The WhatsOnStage Awards, founded in 2001 as the Theatregoers' Choice Awards, are a fan-driven set of awards organised by the theatre website WhatsOnStage.com, based on a popular vote recognising performers and productions of English theatre, with an emphasis on London's West End theatre.

The 2009 WhatsOnStage Award nominees and winners were:

| Best New Play | Best New Musical |
|---|---|
| Under the Blue Sky; August: Osage County; Black Watch; Now or Later; That Face; The Pitmen Painters | Jersey Boys; Eurobeat; Imagine This; Marguerite; Never Forget; Zorro |
| Best Play Revival | Best Musical Revival |
| Ivanov, Donmar West End; Six Characters in Search of an Author; Speed the Plow; The Chalk Garden; The Norman Conquests; Waste | West Side Story; Candide; Gigi; La Cage aux Folles; Piaf; They're Playing Our Song |
| Best Actor in a Play | Best Actress in a Play |
| Kenneth Branagh for Ivanov, Donmar West End; Adam Godley for Rain Man; Chiwetel Ejiofor for Othello; Eddie Redmayne for Now or Later; Ian McDiarmid for Six Characters in Search of an Author; Kevin Spacey & Jeff Goldblum for Speed the Plow | Katy Stephens for The Histories; Deanna Dunagan for August: Osage County; Lesley Sharp for Harper Regan; Lindsay Duncan for That Face; Margaret Tyzack for The Chalk Garden; Penelope Wilton for The Chalk Garden |
| Best Actor in a Musical | Best Actress in a Musical |
| Ryan Molloy for Jersey Boys; Darius Danesh for Gone With the Wind; Douglas Hodge for La Cage aux Folles; Julian Ovenden for Marguerite; Matt Rawle for Zorro; Rolan Bell for The Harder They Come | Sofia Escobar for West Side Story; Connie Fisher for They're Playing Our Song; Elena Roger for Piaf; Leila Benn Harris for Imagine This; Lisa O'Hare for Gigi; Ruthie Henshall for Marguerite |
| Best Supporting Actor in a Play | Best Supporting Actress in a Play |
| Tom Hiddleston for Othello & Ivanov, Donmar West End; Douglas Henshall for The Last Days of Judas Iscariot; Kevin McNally for Ivanov, Donmar West End; Malcolm Sinclair for Rosmersholm; Paul Ready for Major Barbara; Pip Carter for Gethsemane | Sophie Thompson for The Female of the Species; Barbara Jefford for Pygmalion; Denise Gough for Six Characters in Search of an Author; Michelle Terry for The Man Who Had All the Luck; Phoebe Nicholls for The Vortex & Waste; Susan Engel for Her Naked Skin |
| Best Supporting Actor in a Musical | Best Supporting Actress in a Musical |
| Stephen Ashfield for Jersey Boys; Alexander Hanson for Marguerite; Jason Pennycooke for La Cage aux Folles; Luke Evans for Piaf; Michael Matus for Imagine This; Nick Cavaliere for Zorro | Tracie Bennett for La Cage aux Folles; Lesli Margherita for Zorro; Linda Thorson for Gigi; Lorraine Bruce for Piaf; Natasha Yvette Williams for Gone With the Wind; Sophia Ragavelas for Never Forget |
| Best Direction | Best Lighting Designer |
| Michael Grandage for Othello, The Chalk Garden &Ivanov; Emma Rice for Brief Encounter; Matthew Warchus for The Norman Conquests; Michael Boyd for The Histories; Rupert Goold for The Last Days of Judas Iscariot, Six Characters in Search of an Author & No Man's Land; Samuel West for Dealer's Choice & Waste | Mark Henderson for Under the Blue Sky, Marguerite & The Sea; Chahine Yavroyan for Relocated & Wig Out!; Jean Kalman for The Year of Magical Thinking & In the Red & Brown Water; Malcolm Rippeth for Brief Encounter & Six Characters in Search of an Author; Neil Austin for Piaf, No Man's Land & Oedipus; Paule Constable for Othello, The Chalk Garden & Ivanov |
| Best Set Design | Best Choreographer |
| Klara Zieglerova for Jersey Boys; Eugene Lee for Imagine This; Miriam Buether for In the Red & Brown Water; Neil Murray for Brief Encounter; Rob Howell for The Norman Conquests; Tom Piper for The Histories | Lynne Page for La Cage aux Folles; Akram Khan for in-i; Karen Bruce for Never Forget; Kate Prince + ZooNation for Into the Hoods; Matthew Bourne for Dorian Gray; Rafael Amargo for Zorro |
| Best Off-West End Production | Best Regional Production |
| Come Dancing; An Enemy of the People; Piranha Heights; Plague Over England; The Vaclav Havel season; The White Devil | Hamlet; Calendar Girls; On the Waterfront; Once Upon a Time; The Glass Menagerie; The Music Man |
| Best Solo Performance | Best Ensemble Performance |
| Eddie Izzard for Stripped; David Bradley for The Quiz; Derren Brown for Derren Brown Mindreader: An Evening of Wonders; Maria Friedman for Maria Friedman: Re-Arranged; Nadine Marshall for Random; Vanessa Redgrave for The Year of Magical Thinking | Into the Hoods; August: Osage County; Black Watch; Brief Encounter; The Histories; The Norman Conquests |
| Best Takeover in a Role | Best Shakespearean Production |
| Daniel Boys for Avenue Q; Denis Lawson for La Cage aux Folles; Kelly Brook for Fat Pig; Rachel Tucker for We Will Rock You; Summer Strallen for The Sound of Music; Suzanne Shaw for Chicago | Othello; A Midsummer Night's Dream; Much Ado About Nothing; The Histories; The Merry Wives of Windsor; Twelfth Night |
| London Newcomer of the Year | Best New Comedy |
| Josh Hartnett for Rain Man; Ella Smith for Fat Pig; George Sampson for Into the Hoods; Joseph Mawle for The Last Days of Judas Iscariot; Ray Davies for Come Dancing; Tarell Alvin McCraney for In the Red & Brown Water | Fat Pig; God of Carnage; Lifecoach; The Female of the Species; The Walworth Farce; Well |
