= 2012 WhatsOnStage Awards =

British theatre awards

The WhatsOnStage Awards, founded in 2001 as the Theatregoers' Choice Awards, are a fan-driven set of awards organised by the theatre website WhatsOnStage.com, based on a popular vote recognising performers and productions of English theatre, with an emphasis on London's West End theatre.

The 2012 Whatsonstage Award winners and nominees were:

Best New Play	Best New Musical
Three Days in May; Belongings; Collaborators; Grief; Mogadishu; The Heretic	Matilda the Musical; Betty Blue Eyes; Ghost the Musical; London Road; Rock of Ages; Shrek the Musical
Best Play Revival	Best Musical Revival
Driving Miss Daisy; Anna Christie; Chicken Soup with Barley; Ecstasy; Flare Path; Saved	The Wizard of Oz; Crazy for You; Fings Ain’t Wot They Used T’Be; Parade; Ragtime; South Pacific
Best Actor in a Play	Best Actress in a Play
James Corden – One Man, Two Guvnors; Benedict Cumberbatch – Frankenstein; Jude Law – Anna Christie; Kevin Spacey – Richard III; David Tennant – Much Ado About Nothing; James Earl Jones – Driving Miss Daisy	Vanessa Redgrave – Driving Miss Daisy; Eve Best – Much Ado About Nothing; Kristin Scott Thomas – Betrayal; Ruth Wilson – Anna Christie; Samantha Spiro – Chicken Soup with Barley; Tamsin Greig – Jumpy
Best Actor in a Musical	Best Actress in a Musical
Richard Fleeshman – Ghost the Musical; Bertie Carvel – Matilda the Musical; Nigel Lindsay – Shrek the Musical; Oliver Tompsett – Rock of Ages; Reece Shearsmith – Betty Blue Eyes; Sean Palmer – Crazy for You	Amanda Holden – Shrek the Musical; Caissie Levy – Ghost the Musical; Clare Foster – Crazy for You; Emma Williams – Love Story; Cleo Demetriou, Kerry Ingram, Eleanor Worthington Cox & Sophia Kiely – Matilda the Musical; Sarah Lancashire – Betty Blue Eyes
Best Supporting Actor in a Play	Best Supporting Actress in a Play
Oliver Chris – One Man, Two Guvnors; Arthur Darvill – Dr Faustus; Charles Edwards – Twelfth Night; David Hayman – Anna Christie; Harry Hadden-Paton – Flare Path; Mark Gatiss – Season’s Greetings	Catherine Tate – Season’s Greetings; Bryony Hannah – The Children’s Hour; Doon Mackichan – Jumpy; Jemima Rooper – One Man, Two Guvnors; Niamh Cusack – The Playboy of the Western World; Sheridan Smith – Flare Path
Best Supporting Actor in a Musical	Best Supporting Actress in a Musical
Nigel Harman – Shrek the Musical; Andrew Langtree – Ghost the Musical; Ben Goddard – Million Dollar Quartet; David Burt – Crazy for You; Paul Kaye – Matilda the Musical; Simon Lipkin – Rock of Ages	Hannah Waddingham – The Wizard of Oz; Ann Emery – Betty Blue Eyes; Harriet Thorpe – Crazy for You; Lauren Ward – Matilda the Musical; Meow Meow – The Umbrellas of Cherbourg; Sharon D. Clarke – Ghost the Musical
Best Direction	Best Choreography
Danny Boyle – Frankenstein; Josie Rourke – Much Ado About Nothing; Matthew Warchus – Ghost the Musical; Michael Grandage – King Lear & Luise Miller; Nicholas Hytner – One Man, Two Guvnors; Trevor Nunn – Flare Path & Rosencrantz & Guildenstern Are Dead	Peter Darling – Matilda the Musical; Aline David – The Kitchen; Ashley Wallen – Ghost the Musical; Kate Prince – Some Like It Hip Hop; Kelly Devine – Rock of Ages; Stephen Mear – Crazy for You & Betty Blue Eyes
Best Set Design	Best Lighting Design
Rob Howell – Ghost the Musical & Matilda the Musical; Mark Tildesley – Frankenstein; Jon Bausor – Lord of the Flies; Miriam Buether – Decade; Paul Wills – Anna Christie; Robert Jones – The Wizard of Oz	Hugh Vanstone – Ghost the Musical; Bruno Poet – Frankenstein; Mark Henderson – The Kitchen, 13 & Emperor & Galilean; Paule Constable – Luise Miller; Neil Austin – Betty Blue Eyes; Oliver Fenwick – My City
Best Takeover In A Role	Best London Newcomer of the Year
Alfie Boe – Les Misérables; Alex Gaumond – We Will Rock You; Kimberley Walsh – Shrek the Musical; Matt Lucas – Les Misérables; Susan McFadden – Legally Blonde; Tara Fitzgerald – Broken Glass	Tim Minchin – Matilda the Musical; Danielle Hope – The Wizard of Oz; Johnny Flynn – The Heretic; Kara Tointon – Pygmalion; Kyle Soller – The Glass Menagerie, Government Inspector & The Faith Machine; Shayne Ward – Rock of Ages
Best Off-West End Production	Best Regional Production
The Riots – at the Tricycle; Accolade – at the Finborough; Realism – at Soho; The Animals & Children Took to the Streets – at the Battersea Arts Centre; The Belle’s Stratagem – at Southwark Playhouse; Thrill Me: The Leopold & Loeb Story – at the Tristan Bates & Charing Cross	Sweeney Todd – at Chichester Festival; 20th Century Boy – at the New Wolsey Theatre, Ipswich; Love, Love, Love – at the Drum Theatre, Plymouth & on tour; Macbeth – at the Liverpool Everyman; Othello – at the Sheffield Crucible; The Go Between – at West Yorkshire Playhouse, Derby LIVE and Royal & Derngate, Northampton
Best New Comedy	Best Shakespearean Production
One Man, Two Guvnors – by Richard Bean; Get Santa! – by Anthony Neilson; Jumpy – by April de Angelis; No Naughty Bits – by Steve Thompson; Potted Panto – by Daniel Clarkson, Jefferson Turner & Richard Hurst; The Village Bike – by Penelope Skinner	Much Ado About Nothing – at Wyndham’s; Hamlet – at the Young Vic; King Lear – at Donmar Warehouse; Much Ado About Nothing – at Shakespeare’s Globe; Richard III – at the Old Vic; The Tempest – at the Theatre Royal Haymarket
Best Solo Performance	Best Ensemble Performance
Kerry Ellis – Anthems; Daniel Kitson – It’s Always Right Now Until It’s Later; John Leguziamo – Ghetto Klown; Ruby Wax – Losing It; Simon Callow – Being Shakespeare; Stephanie Street – The Nightwatchman	London Road; Backbeat; Richard III & The Comedy of Errors; Some Like It Hip Hop; The 25th Annual Putnam County Spelling Bee; Top Girls
Best West End Show
War Horse; Wicked; Les Miserables; Jersey Boys; The Phantom of the Opera; We Will Rock You
Theatre Event of the Year
David Tennant & Catherine Tate reuniting on stage – in Much Ado About Nothing; Headlong’s commemoration of 9/11 with Decade, written by 18 authors & staged in a disused office block at St Katharine’s Dock; Michael Sheen & Bill Mitchell’s National Theatre of Wales staging of The Passion on the streets of Port Talbot; The Bush Theatre’s 24-hour cycle of 66 Books, in response to the 400th anniversary of the King James Bible, to open its new Shepherd’s Bush Library home; The Phantom of the Opera’s 25th anniversary concert at the Royal Albert Hall & screened to cinemas worldwide; The Royal Shakespeare Company’s 50th anniversary season & reopening of the Royal Shakespeare & Swan Theatre in Stratford-upon-Avon; Danny Boyle’s return to the stage with Frankenstein and his alternate casting of Benedict Cumberbatch and Jonny Lee Miller in the leads; Duckie’s Lullaby, the Barbican’s first-ever sleepover show; The National’s opening of its Paintframe as a one-off performance space; Benefit concert to rescue Dress Circle
