= 2011 WhatsOnStage Awards =

British theatre awards

The WhatsOnStage Awards, founded in 2001 as the Theatregoers' Choice Awards, are a fan-driven set of awards organised by the theatre website WhatsOnStage.com, based on a popular vote recognising performers and productions of English theatre, with an emphasis on London's West End theatre.

The 2011 WhatsOnStage Award nominees and winners were:

Best New Play	Best New Musical
Anne Boleyn; Blood & Gifts; Posh; Red; Ruined; Tribes	Legally Blonde; All the Fun of the Fair; Departure Lounge; Fela!; Flashdance; Love Never Dies
Best Play Revival	Best Musical Revival
Cat on a Hot Tin Roof; After the Dance; All My Sons; Deathtrap; Design for Living; The Real Thing	Les Misérables 25th anniversary; Bells Are Ringing; Hair; Into the Woods; Passion; Sweet Charity
Best Actor in a Play	Best Actress in a Play
David Suchet for All My Sons; Benedict Cumberbatch for After the Dance; Matthew Macfadyen for Private Lives; Rory Kinnear for Hamlet; Simon Russell Beale for Deathtrap & London Assurance; Toby Stephens for The Real Thing	Zoë Wanamaker for All My Sons; Helen McCrory for The Late Middle Classes; Jenny Jules for Ruined; Kim Cattrall for Private Lives; Nancy Carroll for After the Dance; Tracie Bennett for End of the Rainbow
Best Supporting Actor in a Play	Best Supporting Actress in a Play
Nigel Lindsay for Broken Glass; Adam James for Blood & Gifts; Adrian Scarborough for After the Dance; Eddie Redmayne for Red; Lee Ross for Birdsong; Stephen Campbell Moore for All My Sons	Tamsin Greig for The Little Dog Laughed; Clare Higgins for Hamlet; Emma Cunniffe for The Crucible; Fiona Shaw for London Assurance; Harriet Walter for Women Beware Women; Jemima Rooper for All My Sons
Best Actor in a Musical	Best Actress in a Musical
Ramin Karimloo for Love Never Dies; Alex Gaumond for Legally Blonde; John Owen-Jones for Les Misérables 25th anniversary; Mark Umbers for Sweet Charity; Michael Arden for Aspects of Love; Sahr Ngaujah for Fela!	Sheridan Smith for Legally Blonde; Anna-Jane Casey for Bells Are Ringing; Elena Roger for Passion; Sierra Boggess for Love Never Dies; Tamzin Outhwaite for Sweet Charity; Victoria Hamilton-Barritt for Flashdance
Best Supporting Actor in a Musical	Best Supporting Actress in a Musical
Joseph Millson for Love Never Dies; Chris Ellis-Stanton for Legally Blonde; Dave Willetts for Aspects of Love; Michael Xavier for Into the Woods; Paul J Medford for Sweet Charity; Tim Newman for All the Fun of the Fair	Jill Halfpenny for Legally Blonde; Hannah Waddingham for Into the Woods; Josefina Gabrielle for Sweet Charity; Rosalie Craig for Aspects of Love; Scarlett Strallen for Passion; Summer Strallen for Love Never Dies
Best Set Designer	Best Lighting Designer
Joanna Scotcher for The Railway Children; Bunny Christie for Men Should Weep; Miriam Buether for Sucker Punch & Earthquakes in London; Morgan Large for Flashdance; Soutra Gilmour for Into the Woods; Stephen Brimson-Lewis for An Ideal Husband	James Farncombe for Ghost Stories; Neil Austin for The Prince of Homburg & Women Beware Women; Paul Keogan for Novecento; Paule Constable for Blasted, Posh & Love Never Dies; Peter Mumford for Sucker Punch; Rick Fisher for Tribes
Best Director	Best Choreographer
Timothy Sheader for Into the Woods & The Crucible; Howard Davies for All My Sons, The White Guard &; Blood & Gifts; Nicholas Hytner for Hamlet & London Assurance; Roger Michell for Rope & Tribes; Rupert Goold for Earthquakes in London; Thea Sharrock for After the Dance	Jerry Mitchell for Legally Blonde; Arlene Phillips for Flashdance; Bill T Jones for Fela!; Jason Gilkison for Burn the Floor; Karole Armitage for Hair; Stephen Mear for Shoes & Sweet Charity
Best Off-West End Production	Best Regional Production
La Bohème; A Number; Bells Are Ringing; The Beauty Queen of Leenane; The Drowsy Chaperone; The Wages of Thin	Chess; Hamlet; Antony & Cleopatra; 42nd Street; Lend Me a Tenor; A Raisin in the Sun
Best Solo Performance	Best Ensemble Performance
Meera Syal for Shirley Valentine; Bob Golding for Morecambe; Caroline O’Connor for The Showgirl Within; Hugh Hughes for The Wonderful World of Hugh Hughes; Michael Gambon for Krapp’s Last Tape; Simon Callow for Shakespeare – The Man from Stratford, Dr Marigold & Mr Chops	Les Misérables 25th anniversary; Hair; Men Should Weep; Posh; When We Are Married; Women, Power & Politics
Best Takeover in a Role	Best Shakespearean Production
Rachel Tucker for Wicked; Ben Richards for Priscilla, Queen of the Desert; Denise Van Outen for Legally Blonde; Griff Rhys-Jones for Oliver!; Kerry Ellis for Oliver!; Lee Mead for Wicked	Hamlet; As You Like It; Henry IV, Part 1 and Henry IV, Part 2; Macbeth; Measure for Measure; The Comedy of Errors
London Newcomer of the Year	Best West End Show
Jonathan Groff for Deathtrap; Ali Bastian & Brian Fortuna for Burn the Floor; Anya Reiss for Spur of the Moment; Daniel Kaluuya for Sucker Punch; Jacob Casselden for Tribes; Robyn Addison for The Rivals	Wicked; Jersey Boys; Les Miserables; Priscilla, Queen of the Desert; The Phantom of the Opera; War Horse
Best New Comedy
Yes, Prime Minister; Clybourne Park; Midsummer; Morecambe; Really Old, Like Forty-Five; The Little Dog Laughed
