= 2008 WhatsOnStage Awards =

British theatre awards

The WhatsOnStage Awards, founded in 2001 as the Theatregoers' Choice Awards, are a fan-driven set of awards organised by the theatre website WhatsOnStage.com, based on a popular vote recognising performers and productions of English theatre, with an emphasis on London's West End theatre.

The 2008 WhatsOnStage Award nominees and winners were:

| Best New Play | Best New Musical |
|---|---|
| All About My Mother; A Disappearing Number; Joe Guy; Landscape with Weapon; That Face; War Horse | Hairspray; Bad Girls: The Musical; Parade; Take Flight; The Drowsy Chaperone; The Lord of the Rings |
| Best Play Revival | Best Musical Revival |
| Equus; Boeing-Boeing; Saint Joan; The Country Wife; The Dumb Waiter; In Celebration | Joseph & the Amazing Technicolor Dreamcoat; Buddy; Fiddler on the Roof; Grease; Little Shop of Horrors; Rent |
| Best Actor in a Play | Best Actress in a Play |
| Ian McKellen for King Lear; John Simm for Elling; Paterson Joseph for The Emperor Jones; Patrick Stewart for Macbeth; Robert Lindsay for The Entertainer; Charles Dance for Shadowlands | Maggie Smith for The Lady from Dubuque; Anne-Marie Duff for Saint Joan; Janie Dee for Shadowlands; Kate Fleetwood for Macbeth; Kristin Scott Thomas for The Seagull; Tamsin Greig for Much Ado About Nothing |
| Best Actor in a Musical | Best Actress in a Musical |
| Michael Ball for Hairspray; Bertie Carvel for Parade; Henry Goodman for Fiddler on the Roof; James Loye for The Lord of the Rings; Lee Mead for Joseph & the Amazing Technicolor Dreamcoat; Paul Keating for Little Shop of Horrors | Leanne Jones for Hairspray; Denise Van Outen for Rent; Lara Pulver for Parade; Sheridan Smith for Little Shop of Horrors; Summer Strallen for The Drowsy Chaperone; Susan McFadden for Grease |
| Best Supporting Actor in a Play | Best Supporting Actress in a Play |
| Lee Evans for The Dumb Waiter; David Haig for The Country Wife; Mark Gatiss for All About My Mother; Nigel Lindsay for Awake & Sing; Paul Ritter for The Hothouse; Rory Kinnear for The Man of Mode | Diana Rigg for All About My Mother; Amanda Hale for The Glass Menagerie; Andrea Riseborough for The Pain & the Itch; Frances de la Tour for Boeing-Boeing; Pam Ferris for The Entertainer; Ruth Wilson for Philistines |
| Best Supporting Actor in a Musical | Best Supporting Actress in a Musical |
| Ben James-Ellis for Hairspray; Dean Collinson for Joseph & the Amazing Technicolor Dreamcoat; Mel Smith for Hairspray; Michael Jibson for Take Flight; Michael Therriault for The Lord of the Rings; Shaun Escoffery for Parade | Tracie Bennett for Hairspray; Beverley Klein for Fiddler on the Roof; Elaine Paige for The Drowsy Chaperone; Laura Michelle Kelly for The Lord of the Rings; Nicole Faraday for Bad Girls; Preeya Kalidas for Joseph & the Amazing Technicolor Dreamcoat |
| Best Direction | Best Choreography |
| Jack O'Brien for Hairspray; Marianne Elliott for Much Ado About Nothing, Saint Joan and War Horse; Matthew Warchus for Boeing-Boeing and The Lord of the Rings; Roger Michell for Landscape and Betrayal; Rupert Goold for The Glass Menagerie, The Tempest, Rough Crossings and Macbeth; Thea Sharrock for Equus, The Emperor Jones and Cloud Nine | Jerry Mitchell for Hairspray; Bill Deamer for Lady Be Good; Casey Nicholaw for The Drowsy Chaperone; Kate Flatt for Fiddler on the Roof; Peter Darling for The Lord of the Rings; Rob Ashford for Parade |
| Best Set Design | Best New Comedy |
| Rob Howell for The Lord of the Rings; Anthony Ward for Glengarry Glen Ross, Macbeth, The Arsonists and Rhinoceros; Bunny Christie for Philistines and Women of Troy; David Rockwell for Hairspray; Hildegard Bechtler for All About My Mother and The Hothouse; Rae Smith & the Handspring Puppet Company for War Horse | Elling; Moonlight & Magnolias; Rafta Rafta; The Pain & the Itch; Vernon God Little; Whipping It Up |
| Best Off-West End Production | Best Regional Production |
| A Christmas Carol & The Magic Flute; I Love You Because; Dealer's Choice; tHe dYsFUnCKshOnalZ!; The Masque of the Red Death; Vernon God Little | Pygmalion; Angels in America; Henry V; Never Forget; Sunshine on Leith; The Big Secret Live: I Am Shakespeare |
| Best Solo Performance | Best Ensemble Performance |
| Fiona Shaw for Happy Days; Lucy Briers for Some Kind of Bliss; Patrick Kielty for A Night in November; Ralf Little for Stacy; Richard Schiff for Underneath the Lintel; Robert Bathurst for Alex | The Taming of the Shrew & Twelfth Night''; Betrayal; Dealer's Choice; Glengarry Glen Ross; Philistines; War Horse |
| Best Takeover in a Role | Best Shakespearean Production |
| Kerry Ellis for Wicked; Dianne Pilkington for Wicked; Kelly Osbourne for Chicago; Leila Benn Harris & Robyn North for The Phantom of the Opera; Peter Davison for Spamalot; Ramin Karimloo for The Phantom of the Opera | Macbeth; Antony & Cleopatra; A Midsummer Night's Dream; King Lear; Much Ado About Nothing; The Merchant of Venice |
London Newcomer of the Year
Daniel Radcliffe for Equus; Arthur Darvill for Terre Haute and Swimming with Sharks; Billie Piper for Treats; Colin Morgan for Vernon God Little and All About My Mother; Leanne Jones for Hairspray; Orlando Bloom for In Celebration
