= Running Wild (novel) =

2009 children's novel by Michael Morpurgo

- First edition
- Author: Michael Morpurgo
- Illustrator: Sarah Young
- Language: English
- Genre: Children's
- Set in: Indonesia
- Publisher: HarperCollins
- Publication date: 2009
- Publication place: United Kingdom
- Media type: Print
- Pages: 347
- Awards: Independent Bookseller's Children's Book of the Year 2010
- ISBN: 978-0-00-726701-9
- OCLC: 373477685

Running Wild is a children's novel by Michael Morpurgo first published in 2009 by HarperCollins . It recounts the adventures of a boy who has to survive in the Indonesian jungle after being rescued from a tsunami by an elephant. The novel is loosely based on the true story of a girl who was saved from the 2004 Indian Ocean earthquake and tsunami by an elephant. In 2016, Samuel Adamson adapted the book for the stage, in a production directed by Timothy Sheader at the Regent's Park Open Air Theatre.

== Plot summary ==
Running Wild by Michael Morpurgo starts with a boy, Will Robert, riding an elephant along a beach, whilst on holiday in Indonesia. Will is grieving for his father, Robert, who died in the Iraq War. The elephant, Oona, is in an odd mood that day: her handler mentions that she refused to go into the sea for her usual morning dip. Suddenly, Oona charges off with Will clinging on for dear life. As they ascend a hill, Will witnesses the Boxing Day tsunami obliterating the beach where he had been moments earlier. Will is very sad.

Oona heads into the jungle with Will on her back, and Will gradually learns to communicate with her and finds fruit and water enabling him to survive in the wild. He also remembers a long-ago lesson from his father, who taught him how to catch fish from a stream using his clothing as a net. However, Will struggles with biting insects and leeches. One day, there is a standoff between Oona and a tiger, and Will remembers the poem "The Tyger" by William Blake. Saying this poem out loud gives Will courage. This courage is needed when Will is kidnapped by hunters, and finds out about threats to the rainforest through trade in exotic pets, animal furs, palm oil and timber. Later Will escapes with the help of a chef, Kaya, who frees them by cutting open their wooden cage, leaving Will and the orangutans to run back into the wild. They wander the rainforest until they run into Oona. Will is over joyed to find Oona and climbs on her back with the orangutans.

== Background ==
The idea for the book came from a newspaper article Morpurgo had read about a girl who was saved from the 2004 Indian Ocean earthquake and tsunami by an elephant who broke loose from its handler after sensing the tsunami was approaching, and bolted off into the jungle, saving the girl's life. (Note: In some news reports, it is incorrectly stated that it was a boy who was saved by an elephant during the 2004 Indian Ocean earthquake and tsunami. However, in the book, the character is a boy who is saved.) Morpurgo was also influenced by The Jungle Book and The Elephant's Child, his two favourite stories from his childhood. He said "deep down, I've always wanted to write a book about a wild child and an elephant".

== Reception ==
British author Linda Newbery opined that Morpurgo has the "happy knack of speaking to both child and adult readers, and the vast body of his work ... are those exploring bonds between humans and animals; with its emphasis on animal instincts and social behaviour, part epic adventure, part plea for threatened habitats, this novel will surely rank alongside his best-loved books". David Robinson from The Scotsman wrote that "the ecological twist he gives to the story, and its message that humankind can be saved through contact with animals, could almost be the template for Morpurgo's work".

John Millen wrote in the South China Morning Post that "Will's survival and adventures in the jungle make exciting reading, but the question of how he will be rescued, and then reunited with his grandparents, hangs over a lot of the action; at the end of the novel, Morpurgo offers no easy solutions to the problem of Will's future". David Murphy wrote in Reading Time that "this story is beautifully written and very easy to read; the animal characters are well developed and endearing; the author has obviously done a great deal of background research, as their behavior feels naturalistic and appropriate". Ruth Bamford from NATE Classroom remarked that "it is quite an easy read and the adventures will appeal to both sexes and a wide age range; the black and white illustrations are few but powerful, and the illustrated drop caps at the start of each chapter are a nice touch".

== Stage adaptation ==
In 2016, Samuel Adamson adapted the book for the stage, in a production directed by Timothy Sheader at the Regent's Park Open Air Theatre. British theatre critic Lyn Gardner noted how in the play the story is about a girl, Lilly, (a boy in the original book). She went on to say that it was the "lifesize animal puppets who are the real draw in a piece that lacks a convincing emotional underpinning – Lilly's loss of both parents seem to pass almost unnoticed – and is way too earnest in the delivery of its conservation message; but it's a brilliant spectacle". Primary Times said "epic production, complete with spectacular life-size puppets, tells an emotional and moving story of love, loss and loyalty and of living for the moment".
