= 2010 WhatsOnStage Awards =

British theatre awards

The WhatsOnStage Awards, founded in 2001 as the Theatregoers' Choice Awards, are a fan-driven set of awards organised by the theatre website WhatsOnStage.com, based on a popular vote recognising performers and productions of English theatre, with an emphasis on London's West End theatre.

The 2010 WhatsOnStage Award nominees and winners were:

Best New Play	Best New Musical
Jerusalem; Burnt by the Sun; Enron; Punk Rock; The Habit of Art; The Mountaintop	Priscilla, Queen of the Desert; Been So Long; Dreamboats & Petticoats; Sister Act; Spring Awakening; Thriller Live!
Best Play Revival	Best Musical Revival
A Streetcar Named Desire; A View from the Bridge; Arcadia; Enjoy; Three Days of Rain; Waiting for Godot	Oliver!; A Little Night Music; Annie Get Your Gun; Carousel; Hello, Dolly!; Sunset Boulevard
Best Actor in a Play	Best Actress in a Play
Jude Law for Hamlet; David Harewood for The Mountaintop; Dominic West for Life Is a Dream; Ken Stott for A View from the Bridge; Mark Rylance for Jerusalem; Samuel West for Enron	Rachel Weisz for A Streetcar Named Desire; Alison Steadman for Enjoy; Fiona Shaw for Mother Courage & Her Children; Helen Mirren for Phedre; Juliet Stevenson for Duet for One; Lesley Sharp for The Rise & Fall of Little Voice
Best Actor in a Musical	Best Actress in a Musical
Rowan Atkinson for Oliver!; Alexander Hanson for A Little Night Music; Aneurin Barnard for Spring Awakening; Jason Donovan for Priscilla, Queen of the Desert; Julian Ovenden for Annie Get Your Gun; Tony Sheldon for Priscilla, Queen of the Desert	Patina Miller for Sister Act; Charlotte Wakefield for Spring Awakening; Hannah Waddingham for A Little Night Music; Jane Horrocks for Annie Get Your Gun; Kathryn Evans for Sunset Boulevard; Samantha Spiro for Hello, Dolly!
Best Supporting Actor in a Play	Best Supporting Actress in a Play
Patrick Stewart for Hamlet; David Dawson for Comedians; John Shrapnel for Phedre; Mackenzie Crook for Jerusalem; Marc Warren for The Rise & Fall of Little Voice; Simon Paisley Day for Entertaining Mr Sloane	Miriam Margolyes for Endgame; Amanda Drew for Enron; Carol Macready for Enjoy; Hayley Atwell for A View from the Bridge; Kate Fleetwood for Life Is a Dream; Michelle Dockery for Burnt by the Sun
Best Supporting Actor in a Musical	Best Supporting Actress in a Musical
Oliver Thornton for Priscilla, Queen of the Desert; Burn Gorman for Oliver!; Clive Carter for Priscilla, Queen of the Desert; Daniel Crossley for Hello, Dolly!; Gabriel Vick for A Little Night Music; Iwan Rheon for Spring Awakening	Jodie Prenger for Oliver!; Jessie Buckley for A Little Night Music; Julia Sutton for Sister Act; Lesley Garrett for Carousel; Maureen Lipman for A Little Night Music; Sheila Hancock for Sister Act
Best Set Designer	Best Lighting Designer
Brian Thomson for Priscilla, Queen of the Desert; Christopher Oram for A Streetcar Named Desire & Twelfth Night; Lizzie Clachan for Money, Shunt & Treasure Island; Miriam Buether for Judgment Day & When the Rain Stops Falling; Peter McKintosh for Prick Up Your Ears, Entertaining Mr Sloane; & Hello, Dolly!; William Dudley for Peter Pan	Natasha Katz for Sister Act; Johanna Town for Speaking in Tongues; Kevin Adams for Spring Awakening; Mark Henderson for Enron; Mike Robertson for On the Waterfront; Neil Austin for Life Is a Dream & Madame de Sade
Best Director	Best Choreographer
Trevor Nunn for Inherit the Wind & A Little Night Music; Gregory Doran for Hamlet; Ian Rickson for Parlour Song & Jerusalem; Nicholas Hytner for Phedre & The Habit of Art; Rupert Goold for Enron; Sam Mendes for The Cherry Orchard & The Winter’s Tale	Ross Coleman for Priscilla, Queen of the Desert; Adam Cooper for Carousel and Shall We Dance; Anthony Van Laast for Sister Act; Bill T Jones for Spring Awakening; Gary Lloyd for Thriller Live!; Stephen Mear for Hello, Dolly!
Best Off-West End Production	Best Regional Production
The Pirates of Penzance; F**king Men; Forbidden Broadway; Kursk; Kurt & Sid; Stovepipe	Adolf Hitler: My Part in His Downfall; It’s a Wonderful Life; Spend Spend Spend; The Caretaker; The Light in the Piazza; The Winslow Boy
Best Solo Performance	Best Ensemble Performance
Derren Brown for Derren Brown: Enigma; Alan Cumming for I Bought a Blue Car Today; Clare Higgins for The Fever; David Hare for Berlin; Rob Brydon for Rob Brydon Live!; Sadie Frost for Touched	On the Waterfront; Arcadia; Dancing; Our Class; The Great Game; The Power of Yes
Best Takeover in a Role	Best Shakespearean Production
John Barrowman for La Cage aux Folles; Brian Conley for Hairspray; Edward Bennett for Hamlet; Melanie C for Blood Brothers; Omid Djalili for Oliver!; Roger Allam for La Cage aux Folles	Hamlet; All’s Well That Ends Well; Hamlet; Othello; The Winters Tale; Twelfth Night
London Newcomer of the Year	Best West End Show
Diana Vickers for The Rise & Fall of Little Voice; Jaime Winstone for The Fastest Clock in the Universe; Lenny Henry for Othello; Nicholas Hoult for New Boy; Patina Miller for Sister Act; Tom Sturridge for Punk Rock	Wicked; Billy Elliot; Hairspray; Jersey Boys; Les Miserables; Mamma Mia!; The Lion King; The Phantom of the Opera; War Horse; We Will Rock You
