= Samuel Adamson =

Australian playwright

- Born: 1969 or 1970 (age 55–56); Adelaide, Australia
- Occupation: Playwright
- Years active: 1996–
- Known for: Clocks and Whistles (1996); All About My Mother (2007); Wife (2019)

Samuel Adamson (born 1969 or 1970) is an Australian playwright based in London, England. Productions of his plays have been staged at the Bush Theatre, The Old Vic, Almeida Theatre, and the Royal National Theatre. In November 2024, his adaptation of Peter Carey's novel Jack Maggs is being staged by the State Theatre Company of South Australia in Adelaide.

== Early life and education ==
Samuel Adamson was born in Adelaide, South Australia, in 1969 or 1970, to parents Scott and Mary Ann.

He grew up on a farm in Victor Harbor, and went to boarding school at Prince Alfred College in Adelaide. He later credited his English teacher Jane Nelson with inspiring him to become a playwright, after his class had to write an assignment called "The 18th Summer". It was to be a scene dramatising what might happen in the future, relating to their study of the play Summer of the Seventeenth Doll, by Australian playwright Ray Lawler.

Adamson studied history at the University of Adelaide, before moving to London in his early twenties, in 1991. He wrote secretly at school and university, but did not tell anyone about his writings at that time.

== Career ==
=== Stage ===
In June 1989 he acted in the play Fathers and Sons in an Independent Theatre production directed by Rob Croser at Theatre 62, in the Adelaide suburb of Hilton. The play was written by Irish dramatist Brian Friel and based on the novel of the same name by Ivan Turgenev. The following year he performed in another Independent Theatre production, this time Joe Orton's 1965 play Loot.

Adamson's debut play was Clocks and Whistles at the Bush Theatre in 1996, directed by Bush artistic director Dominic Dromgoole and with a cast including Kate Beckinsale. It won rave reviews, and was later produced in Germany and New York. The play led to him becoming Pearson Writer in Residence at the Bush from 1997 to 1998.

Adamson's second play was Grace Note, produced in 1997 for the Peter Hall Company at the Old Vic, starring Geraldine McEwan, which was also directed by Dromgoole, but it did not receive high praise from reviewers. His next play was Drink, Dance, Laugh and Lie at the Bush in 1999.

He has written versions of Henrik Ibsen's plays. A Doll's House, directed by Thea Sharrock, was the tenth anniversary production at Southwark Playhouse, London, in 2003, while Pillars of the Community was staged in 2005 at the Royal National Theatre.

He also adapted two plays by Anton Chekhov for tours for the Oxford Stage Company, both directed by Dominic Dromgoole: Three Sisters, which transferred to the Whitehall Theatre, and The Cherry Orchard, which moved to the Riverside Studios. He adapted Bernhard Studlar's Vienna Dreaming at the National Theatre Studio and Arthur Schnitzler's Professor Bernhardi for Dumbfounded Theatre at the Arcola Theatre in 2005 and also on BBC Radio 3. He also wrote Tomorrow Week for BBC Radio 3.

Adamson's play Southwark Fair was directed at the Royal National Theatre in 2005 by artistic director Nicholas Hytner, starring Rory Kinnear, Margaret Tyzack and Con O'Neill. This was the first full-length work written by him to be staged in close to nine years. It was staged in Melbourne in 2011.

His one-woman play Some Kind of Bliss was performed by Lucy Briers at the National Theatre in 2006 and then at the Trafalgar Studios in 2007. He also wrote Fish and Company for the National Youth Theatre and Soho Theatre. In 2005 he contributed to the 24-Hour Plays at the Old Vic and in 2007 to A Chain Play at the Almeida Theatre.

All About My Mother, his stage adaptation of Pedro Almodóvar's film Todo sobre mi madre, was produced to great acclaim at the Old Vic in 2007, starring Lesley Manville and Diana Rigg. It was later staged by the Melbourne Theatre Company and was performed at the Odeon Theatre, Norwood, in Adelaide in 2011. In September 2020, a Finnish National Theatre titled Kaikki äidistäni was staged in Helsinki, starring Janne Reinikainen as Agrado.

His play Mrs Affleck, inspired by Ibsen's Little Eyolf, opened at the Cottesloe Theatre in January 2009, directed by Marianne Elliott and starring Claire Skinner. His adaptation of Truman Capote's Breakfast at Tiffany's, starring Anna Friel and directed by Sean Mathias, opened at the Theatre Royal Haymarket, London in September 2009. A Quiet Island was due to open at the Almeida in 2009, directed by Indhu Rubasingham, but was postponed owing to a clash of commitments.

His play Frank and Ferdinand, an interpretation of the story of the Pied Piper, was part of the National Theatre Connections Festival in 2011, and was performed by young amateur companies all over Britain. Also in 2011, Adamson wrote a short play for the production Decade, commissioned by Rupert Goold for his company Headlong, performed at St Katharine Docks and directed by Goold.

In collaboration with trumpeter Alison Balsom Adamson devised Gabriel, a play using the music of The Fairy Queen and other pieces by Henry Purcell, staged as part of the 2013 summer season at Shakespeare's Globe. The play was directed by Dominic Dromgoole and the cast included Alison Balsom, Sam Cox, and Jessie Buckley. He then worked with American singer Tori Amos on the musical The Light Princess, based on the George MacDonald story The Light Princess, staged at the National Theatre in 2013.

In 2016, Adamson's adaptation of Michael Morpurgo's children's novel Running Wild was staged at the Regent's Park Open Air Theatre. Directed by Timothy Sheader and Dale Rooks, this was the largest scale production ever presented at the theatre, featuring a cast of 40 young people as well as life-sized puppet animals.

In 2019, his play Wife (based on Ibsen's A Doll's House) was staged at the Kiln Theatre in Kilburn, London. In August 2020, a production of Wife was presented by the Seoul Metropolitan Theater Company in Seoul, Korea, directed by Shin Yoo-chung and featuring an ensemble that included actress Son Ji-yoon. It was performed several times, including at Daehangno Arts Theater, and sold out.

In 2024, also at the Kiln, his musical The Ballad of Hattie and James was staged. It was directed by Richard Twyman and starred Charles Edwards, Sophie Thompson, and Suzette Llewellyn. Adamson names this production and Wife at the Kiln as "real career highlights".

In March 2019, Adamson started a collaboration with Geordie Brookman, former director of the State Theatre Company of South Australia (STCSA), who had recently resigned and moved to Berlin, and the new STCSA artistic director, Mitchell Butel, on a stage adaptation of Peter Carey's novel Jack Maggs. The novel is a reworking of the Dickens novel Great Expectations, set in 19th-century London. Owing to the COVID-19 pandemic, much of their work was done over Zoom. The production was staged by the STCSA at the Dunstan Playhouse from 15 to 30 November 2024, starring Mark Saturno, Ahunim Abebe, James Smith, and Nathan O'Keefe, Jacqy Philips, Rachel Burke, Jelena Nicdao, and Dale March, and directed by Brookman. Adamson remains in Adelaide for the duration of the production.

=== Film ===
Adamson wrote the screenplay for the 2007 short film, Running For River, starring Romola Garai and directed by Angus Jackson, but has said that he is not interested in writing for film or television, preferring the stage.

== Personal life ==
Adamson has a brother, David (who is married to journalist and TV presenter Jessica Adamson), and a sister Sally, both of whom live in Adelaide.

His life partner is Richard.
