= Jessica Adamson =

Australian journalist & TV presenter

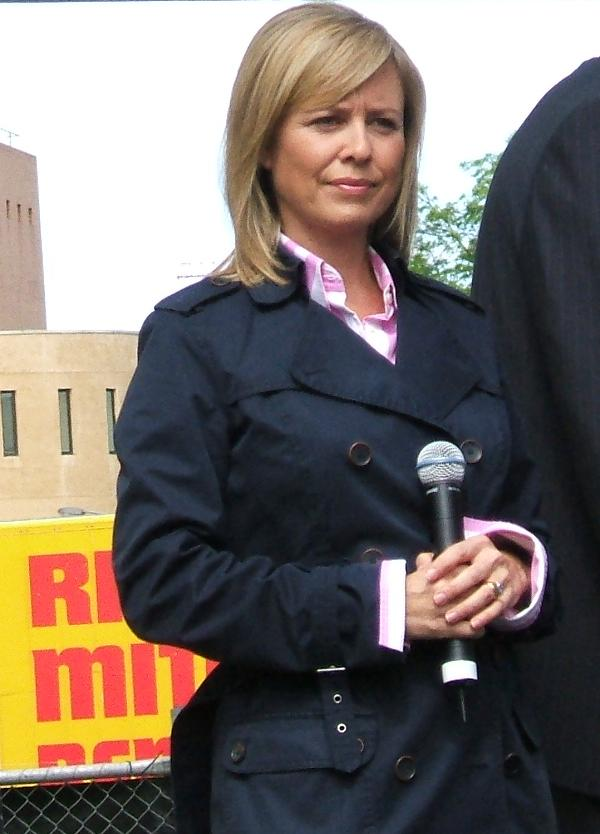
- Born: 1971 or 1972 (age 53–54); South Australia
- Occupations: TV presenter and reporter
- Notable work: Seven News Adelaide

Jessica Adamson (born 1971 or 1972) is an Australian journalist and TV presenter, mainly known for her coverage of crime and world events on Seven News. As of 2024 she is a columnist for The Advertiser, and part of the news team at Adelaide radio station FIVEaa.

== Early life and education ==
Jessica Adamson was born in 1971 or 1972. She grew up on a farm at Hallett, in the Mid North of South Australia.

She completed a journalism degree at the University of South Australia.

== Career ==
Adamson started her journalism career working at the Stock Journal.

She joined 7News in 1997. She spent much of her career there as a crime reporter, but has also acted as foreign correspondent at times, covering the 2004 Asian tsunami; the Olympic Games in Sydney, Athens, and Beijing; the 2002 Bali bombings; and the Bali Nine drug trials.

In December 2014, Adamson was announced as weekend presenter on Seven News Adelaide, replacing Graeme Goodings. She began her new role on 24 January 2015.

On 14 October 2019, Adamson commenced an eight-week period of filling in for Jodie Oddy on the Mix 102.3 radio breakfast show while Oddy was on maternity leave.

On 23 June 2020, Adamson left the Seven Network due to budget cuts.

She is a columnist for The Advertiser, reporting on a variety of topics.

In January 2024, she joined the news team at Adelaide radio station FIVEaa, along with Graeme Goodings.

== Other activities ==
Adamson's first television appearance was in 1990, when she appeared with her sister on Nine Network variety program Hey Hey It's Saturday. Adamson and her sister Amy competed on the show's talent segment Red Faces, where they performed as an act called Ben Sullivan's Sisters, staging a brief routine called "Can't Blow the Candle Out".

Adamson also performs the role of guest speaker at events. She was a keynote speaker at the ANZPAA Police Conference 2024.

She is a board member of the Breakthrough Mental Health Research Foundation and the Adelaide Crows Foundation, and an ambassador for CanTeen and the Royal Flying Doctor Service.

== Awards ==
- 2006: SA Journalist of the Year
- 2015: Best Broadcaster of the Year at the SA Press Club Awards

== Personal life ==
Adamson is married to David Adamson, brother of playwright Samuel Adamson. and they have three children.
