= Hannah Waddingham =

English actress, singer, and television presenter (born 1974)

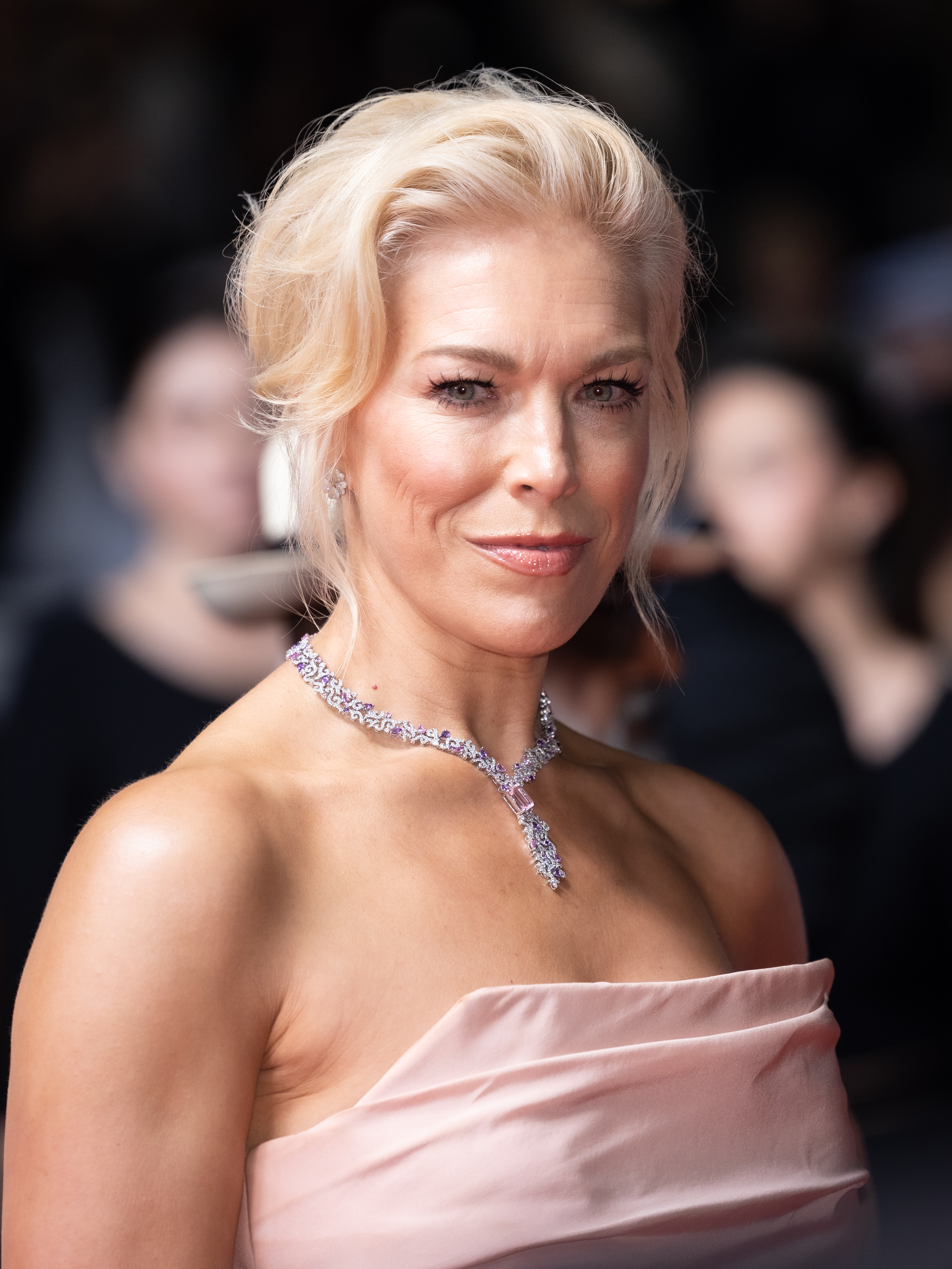
- Waddingham in 2025
- Born: 28 July 1974 (age 52); Wandsworth, London, England
- Education: Academy of Live and Recorded Arts
- Occupations: Actress; singer; television presenter
- Years active: 1997–present
- Works: Full list
- Partner: Nick Beresford-Cleary
- Children: 1
- Awards: Full list

Hannah Waddingham (born 28 July 1974) is an English actress, singer, and television presenter. She is known for roles on both stage and screen, and has received several accolades including a Primetime Emmy Award, two Critics' Choice Television Awards and a Screen Actors Guild Award as well as nominations for two BAFTA TV Awards, two Golden Globe Awards, and three Laurence Olivier Awards.

She gained stardom playing Rebecca Welton in the Apple TV+ comedy series Ted Lasso (since 2020), for which she won a Primetime Emmy Award for Outstanding Supporting Actress in a Comedy Series. Other television roles include playing Tonya Dyke in Benidorm (2014), Septa Unella in Game of Thrones (2015–2016), Jax-Ur in Krypton (2018–2019), Sofia Marchetti in Sex Education (2019–2023), and Judith in Ride or Die (2026). Furthermore, she voices Deliria in the animated series Krapopolis (since 2023), for which she earned an Emmy Award nomination. On film, she has acted in the musical Les Misérables (2012), the thriller Winter Ridge (2018), the animated film The Garfield Movie (2024), the action comedy The Fall Guy (2024), and the action film Mission: Impossible – The Final Reckoning (2025).

On stage, she has appeared in a number of West End musicals, earning three nominations for the Laurence Olivier Award for Best Actress in a Musical for her performances as Lady of the Lake in the Monty Python musical comedy Spamalot (2007), Desirée Armfeldt in the Stephen Sondheim musical revival A Little Night Music (2010), and Katharine in the Cole Porter musical romance comedy Kiss Me, Kate (2013). She made her Broadway debut reprising her role in the New York City transfer of Spamalot (2008). Waddingham also co-hosted the Eurovision Song Contest in 2023 and hosted the Laurence Olivier Awards twice in 2023 and 2024.

== Early life and education ==
Hannah Waddingham was born on 28 July 1974 in Wandsworth, south London. Waddingham is half-Manx; her mother Melodie Kelly is from Port Erin. Her mother was an opera singer, as were both of her maternal grandparents, joining the English National Opera when Waddingham was eight years old. She grew up around the theatre. Her grandfather Harry Waddingham was the oldest known British Second World War veteran at the time of his death in 2026 aged 109.

Waddingham is a graduate of the Academy of Live and Recorded Arts. She has a four-octave vocal range. She started out in dinner theatre, performing in the interactive comedy Joey and Gina's Wedding, produced by Anthony and Joseph Tomaska.

== Career ==
=== Stage career ===
Waddingham has been a stage actress on both London's West End and New York's Broadway. She made her West End debut in Saucy Jack and the Space Vixens at The Queens Theatre in 1998 and went on to star in Lautrec by Charles Aznavour in March 2000, then created the role of Christine Warner in Andrew Lloyd Webber and Ben Elton’s The Beautiful Game, staying with the show for the year-long run at the Cambridge Theatre from September 2000. Further stage roles included Starbird in Space Family Robinson (Julian & Stephen Butler, 2002) and Satan in Tonight's the Night: The Rod Stewart Musical at the Victoria Palace Theatre in 2003.

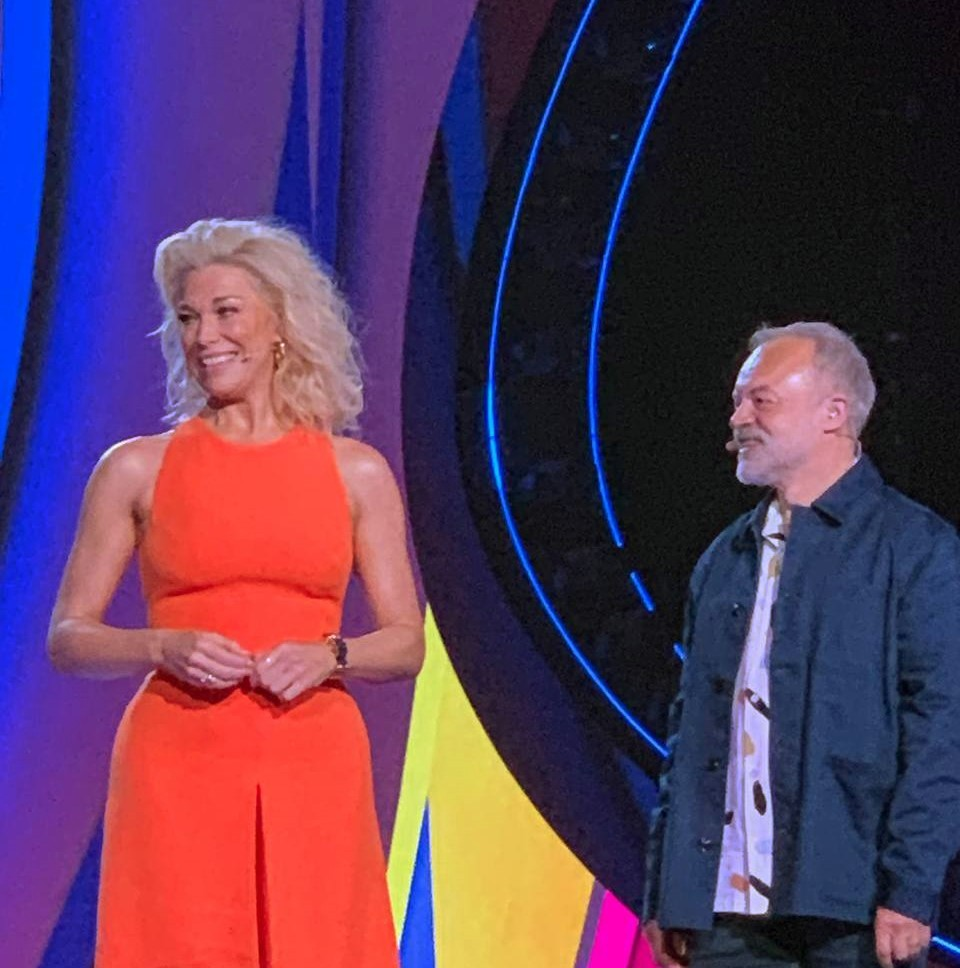
Waddingham alongside co-host Graham Norton at the Saturday afternoon preview show for the Grand Final of the Eurovision Song Contest 2023

Waddingham portrayed the Lady of the Lake in Spamalot, both in the London production and then on Broadway. She received an Olivier Award nomination for the role. She received outstanding reviews for her portrayal of Desirée Armfeldt in Trevor Nunn's revival of A Little Night Music. Waddingham subsequently received a further Olivier Award nomination in 2010 for Best Actress in a Musical for her performance in Night Music.

In mid-2010, Waddingham played the Witch in the production of Into the Woods at London's Open Air Theatre. She originated the role of The Wicked Witch of the West in the West End production of The Wizard of Oz, which opened on 1 March 2011 at the London Palladium and was the first to perform the new Lloyd Webber and Rice song "Red Shoes Blues". She left the production in September 2011. Waddingham won the whatsonstage.com Theatergoers Choice Award for Best Supporting Actress in a Musical for her performance.

In 2012, Waddingham starred in Chichester Festival Theatre's revival of Kiss Me, Kate. The show transferred to the Old Vic Theatre on London's South Bank in November 2012.

On 25 August 2023, Waddingham was announced as the host of the Fantasy, Myths and Legends Prom as part of that year's BBC Proms; on 28 August, she pulled out just hours before the performance, in solidarity with the ongoing SAG-AFTRA strike.

=== Screen career ===
Waddingham made her screen debut in an episode of the sitcom Coupling in 2002, and followed this with a recurring role in the soap opera Brookside. Waddingham made one-off appearances in television series such as William and Mary, Footballers' Wives and Hollyoaks: Let Loose, and then took on the role of Lola Brewster in Agatha Christie's Marple: "The Mirror Crack'd from Side to Side" in 2009. In 2011, Waddingham appeared in series 4, episode 3 of the BBC sitcom, Not Going Out. She played the role of Jane, an actress in an adult film being recorded in the show. She had a small role in the 2012 film Les Misérables. In 2014, Waddingham appeared as Tonya in series 6 of the ITV comedy series Benidorm.

Waddingham portrayed the "Shame Nun", Septa Unella, in season 5 and 6 of Game of Thrones. She began filming her scenes nine weeks after the birth of her daughter and claims that she underwent actual waterboarding during filming so that the scene would look authentic. She was given the role's iconic "shame bell" as a parting gift. She also had a recurring role on the Netflix series Sex Education as Jackson's mother, Sophia Marchetti.

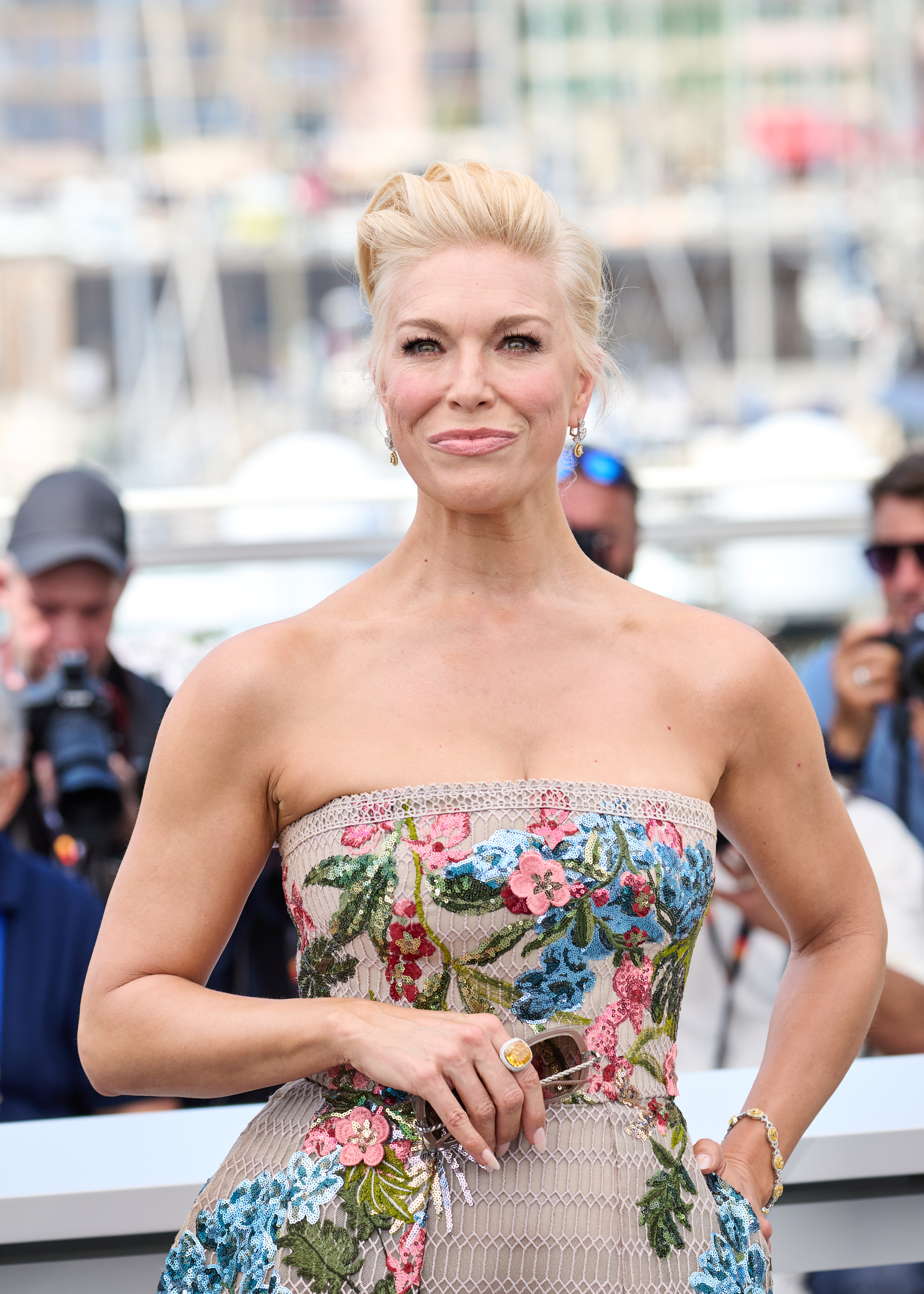
Waddingham at the 2025 Cannes Film Festival

Since 2020, Waddingham has portrayed Rebecca Welton, the owner of AFC Richmond, on the Apple TV+ series Ted Lasso. She did her own singing in the season one episode "Make Rebecca Great Again" and the season two episodes "Carol of the Bells" and "No Weddings and a Funeral". In 2021, she won the Primetime Emmy Award for Outstanding Supporting Actress in a Comedy Series and the Critics' Choice Television Award for Best Supporting Actress in a Comedy Series for the role.

Waddingham also appears as the character Mother Witch in Hocus Pocus 2, Disney's sequel to Hocus Pocus released on Disney+ on 30 September 2022. She portrayed Lady Bellaston in the ITV drama series Tom Jones, based on Henry Fielding's 1749 novel, inspired by the real life of Etheldreda Townshend. In May 2023, Waddingham co-hosted the Eurovision Song Contest 2023 in Liverpool, alongside Alesha Dixon and Ukrainian singer Julia Sanina, with Graham Norton joining them for the final.

Waddingham appeared in the 2024 action-comedy film The Fall Guy alongside Ryan Gosling and Emily Blunt, playing villainous producer Gail. She also voiced Jinx in the 2024 animated feature film The Garfield Movie. In 2025, Waddingham portrayed Admiral Neely alongside Tom Cruise in Mission: Impossible – The Final Reckoning, and held the role of Australian socialite Heidi Heatherley in the thriller The Woman in Cabin 10 opposite Keira Knightley. Waddingham also voiced the Grand Councilwoman in the live action Lilo and Stitch, and voiced Jezebeth in the animated feature film Smurfs.

In 2026, Waddingham co-starred with Octavia Spencer in Prime Video's action-comedy series Ride or Die.

Waddingham's upcoming 2027 film projects include the animated musical adventure film High in the Clouds, and action-comedy Jason Statham Stole My Bike.

== Recordings ==
In 2000, Waddingham played the role of Christine in the Andrew Lloyd Webber and Ben Elton musical The Beautiful Game in London's West End. In October 2000, Waddingham (billed simply as "Hannah"), released a single of the song "Our Kind of Love" from the production. The single peaked at No. 41 in the UK charts.

She later sang the role of Starbird on the soundtrack recording of Space Family Robinson (composers: Julian Butler and Stephen Butler), released by Pop! Records in May 2002, coinciding with the stage production (also featuring Waddingham as Starbird) which ran for three weeks at London's Pleasance Theatre.

On 22 November 2023, Waddingham's debut album, a live album, was released. Hannah Waddingham: Home for Christmas was recorded at the show of the same name for Apple TV. The album debuted and peaked at numbers 51 and 43 on the UK Albums Downloads and Soundtrack Albums charts, respectively.

== Personal life ==
Waddingham emigrated to Australia in 2012 but returned soon after. She was in a relationship with Italian businessman Gianluca Cugnetto for a decade. In 2014, they had a daughter whom Waddingham has raised as a single parent since her daughter was two years old.

Waddingham also speaks French and Italian.

== Acting credits ==
Key
†	Denotes works that have not yet been released

=== Film ===
Year	Title	Role	Notes
2008	How to Lose Friends & Alienate People	Elizabeth Maddox	
2012	Les Misérables	Factory Worker	
2015	Meet Pursuit Delange: The Movie	Maddie Forrester	
2016	The Gatehouse	The Agent	
2018	Winter Ridge	Joanne Hill	
2019	The Hustle	Shiraz	
2022	Hocus Pocus 2	Mother Witch	
2024	The Fall Guy	Gail Meyer	
2024	The Garfield Movie	Jinx	Voice
2025	Mission: Impossible – The Final Reckoning	Admiral Neely	
2025	Lilo & Stitch	Grand Councilwoman	Voice
2025	Smurfs	Jezebeth	Voice
2025	The Woman in Cabin 10	Heidi Heatherley	
2027	High in the Clouds †	Gretsch	Voice
2027	Jason Statham Stole My Bike †	TBA	Post-production
TBA	Mr. Sunny Sky †	TBA	In production

=== Television ===
Year	Title	Role	Notes
2002	Coupling	Jenny Turbot	Episode: "Split"
2002	Brookside	Georgina Savage	3 episodes
2003	My Hero	Miranda	Episode: "Time and Time Again"
2005	William and Mary	Penelope	Episode: #3.3
2005	Footballers' Wives	Jools	Episode: #4.9
2005	Hollyoaks: Let Loose	Mrs. Robertson	3 episodes
2006	My Hero	Lula	Episode: "Sidekick"
2006	The Only Boy for Me	Melissa	Television film
2006	Easy Peasy	Kate Barber	Television film
2008	Doctors	Dixie Deadman	Episode: "Miss Letherbridge"
2009	M.I. High	Alannah Sucrose	Episode: "The Glove"
2010	Agatha Christie's Marple	Lola Brewster	Episode: "The Mirror Crack'd from Side to Side"
2010	Doctors	Jacky Parnell	Episode: "Occupational Hazard"
2010–2011	My Family	Katie	3 episodes
2011	Not Going Out	Jane	Episode: "Movie"
2012	Doctors	Rhonda Stowell	Episode: "The Promise"
2012	Bad Education	Loretta	Episode: "Self-Defence"
2014	Benidorm	Tonya Dyke	7 episodes (Series 6)
2015	Doctors	Becky Harmison	Episode: "Subsidence"
2015	Partners in Crime	Blonde Assassin	3 episodes
2015–2016	Game of Thrones	Septa Unella	8 episodes
2016	In the Club	Dr. Stone	4 episodes
2016	Josh	Phillipa	Episode: "Close-up and Long Shot"
2016	The Entire Universe	Time & Space	Television film
2017	12 Monkeys	Magdalena	4 episodes
2018	Bad Move	Imelda	Episode: "Big Deal"
2018–2019	Krypton	Jax-Ur	13 episodes
2019–2023	Sex Education	Sofía Marchetti	11 episodes
2020–present	Ted Lasso	Rebecca Welton	Main role
2021	Midsomer Murders	Mimi Dagmar	Episode: "The Stitcher Society"
2021	Murder, They Hope	Chief Inspector Henrietta Shepherd	Episode: "Dales of the Unexpected"
2022	Willow	Hubert	Episode: "The Battle of the Slaughtered Lamb"
2023	Tom Jones	Lady Bellaston	3 episodes
2023–present	Krapopolis	Deliria	Main voice role
2024	Tiddler	Narrator	Voice, television film
2026	Ride or Die	Judith	Series lead

=== Non-acting television ===
Year	Title	Role	Notes
2014	Our Gay Wedding: The Musical	Herself	Channel 4 TV special
2022	RuPaul's Drag Race UK	Guest judge	Series 4; "Lairy Poppins: The Rusical"
2023	Eurovision Song Contest	Co-presenter	Presenter for semi-finals and grand final (Note: alongside Alesha Dixon, Julia Sanina, and Graham Norton)
2023	Earthshot Prize	Co-presenter	Alongside Sterling K. Brown
2023	Hannah Waddingham: Home for Christmas	Herself	Holiday special for Apple TV+
2023	The Olivier Awards 2023	Host	Awards ceremony (Note: first time as Olivier Awards host)
2024	The Olivier Awards 2024	Host	Awards ceremony (Note: second time as Olivier Awards host)
2025	British Legion Festival of Remembrance	Host	Ceremony
2026	Saturday Night Live UK	Host	Episode: "Hannah Waddingham/Myles Smith"

=== Theatre ===
Year	Title	Role	Theatre	Location
1997	Face the Music	Miss Eisenheimer	Barbican Theatre	London
1998	Saucy Jack and the Space Vixens	Shirley Tristar/Chesty Prospects	Queen's Theatre	West End
2000	Lautrec	Suzanne Valadon	Queen's Theatre	West End
2000–2001	The Beautiful Game	Christine	Cambridge Theatre	West End
2002	Space Family Robinson	Starbird	Pleasance Theatre Islington	London
2003	Tonight's the Night	Satan	Victoria Palace Theatre	West End
2006	Bad Girls: The Musical	Nikki Wade	West Yorkshire Playhouse	Leeds
2006–2007	Spamalot	Lady of the Lake	Palace Theatre	West End
2008	Spamalot	Lady of the Lake	Shubert Theatre	Broadway
2009	A Little Night Music	Desirée Armfeldt	Menier Chocolate Factory	West End
2009	A Little Night Music	Desirée Armfeldt	Garrick Theatre	West End
2010	Into the Woods	The Witch	Regent's Park Open Air Theatre	London
2011	The Wizard of Oz	Miss Gulch / Wicked Witch	London Palladium	West End
2011	Soho Cinders Gala Concert	Marilyn Platt	Queen's Theatre	West End
2012	Kiss Me, Kate	Lilli Vanessi / Katharina Minola	Chichester Festival Theatre	Chichester
2012–2013	Kiss Me, Kate	Lilli Vanessi / Katharina Minola	The Old Vic	London
2013	A Little Hotel on the Side	Mme. Angelique Pinglet	Theatre Royal	Bath
2015	How to Succeed in Business Without Really Trying	Hedy LaRue	Royal Festival Hall	London

=== Audio and radio ===
Year	Title	Role	Company
2009	Sacred Hearts	Appolonia	BBC Radio 4
2010	Number 10	Sheriff	BBC Radio 4
2018	The Taylors	Melissa	BBC Radio 2
2026	A Pressing Engagement	Clementine	Audible
2026	Intimacy	Lou	BBC Sounds

== Discography ==
List of albums, with selected details
Title	Details
Hannah Waddingham: Home for Christmas	Released: 22 November 2023; Label: Apple Video Programming; Format: Digital download, streaming

== Awards and nominations ==
Organization	Year	Category	Work	Result	Ref.
British Academy Television Awards	2024	Best Entertainment Performance	Eurovision Song Contest 2023	Nominated	
British Academy Television Awards	2024	Best Entertainment Programme	Hannah Waddingham: Home for Christmas	Nominated	
Critics' Choice Television Awards	2021	Best Supporting Actress in a Comedy Series	Ted Lasso (season one)	Won	
Critics' Choice Television Awards	2022	Best Supporting Actress in a Comedy Series	Ted Lasso (season two)	Won	
Golden Globe Awards	2021	Best Supporting Actress – Television	Ted Lasso (season one)	Nominated	
Golden Globe Awards	2023	Best Supporting Actress – Television	Ted Lasso (season three)	Nominated	
HCA TV Awards	2021	Best Supporting Actress in a Comedy Series	Ted Lasso	Won	
International Film Festival of Wales	2018	Best Supporting Actress	Winter Ridge	Won	
Laurence Olivier Awards	2007	Best Actress in a Musical	Spamalot	Nominated	
Laurence Olivier Awards	2010	Best Actress in a Musical	A Little Night Music	Nominated	
Laurence Olivier Awards	2013	Best Actress in a Musical	Kiss Me, Kate	Nominated	
Primetime Emmy Awards	2021	Outstanding Supporting Actress in a Comedy Series	Ted Lasso (episode: "All Apologies")	Won	
Primetime Emmy Awards	2022	Outstanding Supporting Actress in a Comedy Series	Ted Lasso (episode: "No Weddings and a Funeral")	Nominated	
Primetime Emmy Awards	2023	Outstanding Supporting Actress in a Comedy Series	Ted Lasso (episode: "International Break")	Nominated	
Primetime Emmy Awards	2024	Outstanding Character Voice-Over Performance	Krapopolis (episode: "Big Man on Hippocampus")	Nominated	
Screen Actors Guild Awards	2021	Outstanding Ensemble in a Comedy Series	Ted Lasso (season one)	Nominated	
Screen Actors Guild Awards	2022	Outstanding Actress in a Comedy Series	Ted Lasso (season two)	Nominated	
Screen Actors Guild Awards	2022	Outstanding Ensemble in a Comedy Series	Ted Lasso (season two)	Won	
Screen Actors Guild Awards	2023	Outstanding Actress in a Comedy Series	Ted Lasso (season three)	Nominated	
Screen Actors Guild Awards	2023	Outstanding Ensemble in a Comedy Series	Ted Lasso (season three)	Nominated	
TCA Awards	2021	Individual Achievement in Comedy	Ted Lasso	Nominated	
WhatsOnStage Awards	2007	Best Actress in a Musical	Spamalot	Nominated	
WhatsOnStage Awards	2010	Best Actress in a Musical	A Little Night Music	Nominated	
WhatsOnStage Awards	2012	Best Supporting Actress in a Musical	The Wizard of Oz	Won	
WhatsOnStage Awards	2013	Best Actress in a Musical	Kiss Me, Kate	Nominated	

== See also ==
- List of British actors
- List of Primetime Emmy Award winners
