= Jumpy (play) =

2011 play by April De Angelis

- Written by: April De Angelis
- Original language: English

Premiere
- Date premiered: 19 October 2011
- Place premiered: Royal Court Theatre

Jumpy is a play by April De Angelis

== Productions ==
Jumpy had its premiere at the Royal Court Theatre on 19 October 2011, following previews from 13 October. It played a limited run to 19 November 2011.

Directed by Nina Raine, the cast included Tamsin Greig, Doon Mackichan, Seline Hizli, Richard Lintern, James Musgrave, Bel Powley, Ewan Stewart, Sarah Woodward and Michael Marcus.

The production transferred to the Duke of York's Theatre with an opening night on 28 August 2012, following previews from 16 August. The production ran until 4 November 2012.

== Awards and nominations ==
Year	Award Ceremony	Category	Nominee	Result
2012	Laurence Olivier Award	Best New Play	April De Angelis	Nominated
2012	Whatsonstage Awards	Best New Play	April De Angelis	Nominated
2012	Whatsonstage Awards	Best Actress in a Play	Tamsin Grieg	Nominated
2012	Whatsonstage Awards	Best Supporting Actress in a Play	Doon Mackichan	Nominated
