= Playhouse Creatures =

1993 play by April de Angelis

Playhouse Creatures is a 1993 play by April De Angelis, set in the theatre world of 17th century London. It premiered at the Theatre Royal Haymarket in 1993 and has since been revived at the Old Vic in 1997, the Dundee Rep in 2007 and the Chichester Festival Theatre in 2012.

Using excerpts from the popular plays of the time, the play, directed by Patsy Templeton, follows the lives of six actresses, exposing their strengths and frailties and the extremes to which some of them chose to go for the sake of their art. The play features an all-female cast.
