= Decade (play) =

2011 stageplay by John Logan

Decade is a 2011 play by John Logan, Lynn Nottage, and 18 other writers commemorating the tenth anniversary of the September 11 attacks. The play is a compilation of 20 individual, shorter plays that combine to form the story's overarching narrative. Its structure is drawn from the work of the choreographer Pina Bausch and it involves a cast of 12.

The play was commissioned by director Rupert Goold for his company, Headlong. It premièred in St Katharine Docks (the site of London's World Trade Centre) and was performed from 1 September to 15 October 2011, in a production starring Lia Williams and directed by Goold. The production received praise for its treatment of the subject material and Goold's direction.

== Authors ==
- Samuel Adamson
- Mike Bartlett
- Alecky Blythe
- Adam Brace
- Ben Ellis
- Ella Hickson
- Samuel D. Hunter
- John Logan
- Matthew Lopez
- Mona Mansour
- DC Moore
- Abi Morgan
- Rory Mullarkey
- Janine Nabers
- Lynn Nottage
- Harrison David Rivers
- Simon Schama
- Christopher Shinn
- Beth Steel
- Alexandra Wood
