= Saucy Jack and the Space Vixens =

- Music: Robin Forrest & Jonathan Croose
- Lyrics: Charlotte Mann & Mike Fidler
- Book: Charlotte Mann
- Premiere: 1995: Edinburgh Festival Fringe

Saucy Jack and the Space Vixens is a cult science fiction musical reminiscent of The Rocky Horror Show. The 2006 West End run starred Faye Tozer and was choreographed by Bruno Tonioli. The cast interact with the audience as if the audience were patrons of the club in which the musical is set.

== Story ==
The story revolves around a cabaret club called "Saucy Jack's", at which the performers become the victims of a serial killer as they try to leave to better themselves elsewhere.

== Characters ==
- 'Saucy' Jack De 'Ath - proprietor of Saucy Jack's Cabaret Bar
- Honey Tipps/Jubilee Climax - Leader of the Vixens
- Bunny Lingus - Space Vixen
- Anna Labia - Space Vixen
- Booby Shevalle - Cocktail waitress at Saucy Jack's
- Shirley Tristar/Chesty Prospects - Intergalactic smuggler
- Sammy Sax - House saxophonist
- Dr Wilhelm von Whackoff - Psychoanalyst
- Mitch Maypole - Barman at Saucy Jack's.

== Production History ==
In 1995 a group of four former students of the University of Kent, Johanna Allitt, Simon Curtis, Mike Fidler and Charlotte Mann, set out to stage a production at the Edinburgh Fringe festival. Their desired production Leonard Bernstein's "Candide" was already going to be playing and so instead they wrote their own piece.

The original West End run of the show opened on 19 March 1998 at the Queen's Theatre on Shaftesbury Avenue. It returned to the West End in 2006 for a short run at The Venue in London.

The show was made available for amateur licence in 2004 through Samuel French Ltd.

Other notable productions of the show include:

- Capital Fringe, Washington DC, USA, 2019
- Hollywood Fringe, California, USA, 2025
