= April De Angelis =

British dramatist

April De Angelis is an acclaimed British playwright known for her powerful exploration of feminist themes and women's lives. Her work spans theatre, radio, and television, blending sharp wit with deep emotional insight. She was elected a Fellow of the Royal Society of Literature in 2020.

De Angelis began her career in the 1980s as an actress with the Monstrous Regiment theatre company. In 1987, her play Breathless was a prize winner at the Second Wave Young Women's Writing Festival, marking the start of her transition into playwriting.

Her plays have been produced by the Royal Court, National Theatre, Royal Shakespeare Company, Hampstead Theatre, and the West End. Notable works include Playhouse Creatures, A Laughing Matter and My Brilliant Friend and her acclaimed adaptation of Elena Ferrante's Neapolitan novels for the stage. April's play Jumpy was nominated for a Laurence Olivier Award in 2012 for Best New Play.

She has also written extensively for radio and television, with work broadcast by the BBC, and has contributed to opera, writing libretti for Flight (Glyndebourne) and The Silent Twins (Almeida).

== Plays ==
- Breathless (1987)
- Women in Law (1988)
- Wanderlust (1988, Oval House Theatre Women's Workshop)
- Visitants (1988)
- Ironmistress (1989, Young Vic Theatre)
- Crux (1989, Paines Plough)
- Frankenstein (1989)
- The Life and Times of Fanny Hill (1991, Red Shift Theatre Company)
- Hush (1992, Royal Court Theatre)
- Greed (1993)
- Soft Vengeance (1993)
- Playhouse Creatures (Haymarket Theatre, 1993)
- The Positive Hour (1997, Out of Joint theatre company / Hampstead Theatre)
- A Warwickshire Testimony (1999, Royal Shakespeare Company)
- A Laughing Matter (2002, Out of Joint theatre company)
- Headstrong (2004, Royal National Theatre Shell Connections)
- Wild East (2005, Royal Court Theatre)
- Catch (Note: With Stella Feehily, Tanika Gupta, Chloe Moss and Laura Wade) (2007, Royal Court Theatre)
- Wuthering Heights (2008) (Note: From the book by Emily Brontë)
- Jumpy (2011)
- After Electra (2015)
- My Brilliant Friend (2017) (Note: From the Neapolitan Novels by Elena Ferrante)
- The Village (2018, Theatre Royal Stratford East) (Note: After Fuenteovejuna by Lope de Vega.)
- Wilderness (2019)
- Kerry Jackson (2020)
- Infamous (2023)
- The Divine Mrs S. (2024)

== Libretti ==
- Pig
- Flight
- Silent Twins (2007)
- Uprising

== Contributor ==
- Seven Plays by Women (1993)
- The Women Writers Handbook (2020)
- Feminist Theatre Then & Now: Celebrating 50 years (2024)
- Encounters with Jane Austen: Celebrating 250 Years (2025)
