= Imagine This =

- Promotional Poster
- Music: Shuki Levy
- Lyrics: David Goldsmith
- Book: Glenn Berenbeim
- Productions: 2008 West End, 2016 Germany, 2018 Czech Republic, 2020 Habima Theater Israel

Imagine This is a musical with music by Shuki Levy, lyrics by David Goldsmith and a book by Glenn Berenbeim. Set in the Warsaw Ghetto during World War II, it focuses on a family of actors trying to stage a play about the siege at ancient Masada to inspire hope and optimism within the Jewish community.

== Background ==
Israeli composer Levy had long nurtured an interest in writing a show about the siege at Masada around 70 CE. He took the music that he had written for the subject to television writer Berenbeim, who resisted the idea, particularly the mass suicide ending of the historical story. But then he decided that the story could work as a play-within-a-play about actors in the Warsaw Ghetto. He told The Times, "I was suddenly interested in the story for its metaphorical value, not its robes and sandals." Goldsmith joined the team, relishing the chance to write for the serious story.

== Productions ==
After a tryout at the Theatre Royal in Plymouth in July 2007, the musical opened in the West End at the New London Theatre on 19 November 2008, following previews from 4 November 2008. It closed on 20 December 2008. Directed by Timothy Sheader, with choreography by Liam Steel, the cast featured Peter Polycarpou and Leila Benn Harris.

The filmed version of the West End production aired throughout 2010 on PBS stations in over 40 markets in the United States, as part of their pledge drives and regular programming. It was broadcast with a panel discussion moderated by Neal Gabler, which included director Timothy Sheader, cast members Peter Polycarpou, Sarah Ingram and Roy Litvin, and Holocaust scholar Thane Rosenbaum.

In October 2014 Theatreworkz, an independent amateur theatre company performed the world Amateur Premiere of Imagine This to resounding critical acclaim from both local audiences, schools and from industry professionals.

In 2016, the Freies Musical-Ensemble Münster staged the German premiere of Imagine This, marking an important milestone for the musical's presence in Germany. The production received significant attention, with composer Shuki Levy himself attending as a guest, underscoring the event's importance.

== Synopsis ==
After a glimpse of happier times in Poland before World War II, the scene shifts to 1942 in the Warsaw Ghetto. There, a company of actors is headed by actor-manager Daniel Warshowsky. Daniel's wife is taken by Nazis.

As the company rehearses a play, Adam, a resistance fighter, bursts in and is hidden by the actors. The Nazis follow and arrest Daniel's son. Being one actor short, Daniel tells Adam he will have to play his son's part. Adam tells the company about the fate awaiting those who board the train to Treblinka. He believes that it is necessary to resist the Nazis. Daniel, on the other hand, believes in theatre as a way to help the Ghetto inhabitants escape the horrible reality in which they live ("Imagine This").

Daniel and the company stage a play about the siege and mass suicide of the Jews at the fortress at Masada around 70 CE by the Roman Empire. The story of the resistance in ancient times parallels the determination by the inhabitants of the Warsaw Ghetto in 1942 to resist the Nazis. Daniel plays the leader of the ancient rebellion, Eleazar ben Ya'ir, and his daughter Rebecca plays Eleazar's daughter Tamar. Tamar is loved by the Roman General Lucius Flavius Silva, played by Adam. Just before the interval, the Nazis board the stage and promise the audience two loaves of bread and a jar of jam if they board the trains to "a new life in the east" on the following morning. They ask the Jews to bring a suitcase each, containing their most precious belongings.

The Nazis offer Daniel and his company safe passage to Switzerland if they carry on with the play in order to keep the Jews calm. The company struggles to decide between collaboration with the Nazis in return for their freedom and life, and sacrificing themselves in order to warn their audience. They decide that those who support standing for the truth will get up after the scene of mass suicide in Masada, and if even one person does not stand they will do nothing. When the scene is complete, they get up one by one until all stand. When the play draws to a close, the Masada landscape is lowered to reveal graffiti written by the actors warning the Jews not to board the train. The outraged Nazis storm the stage, push the company (except Rebecca and Adam) off the stage and murder them (off stage). Adam fights Captain Blick (the Nazi commander), and Rebecca grabs Blick's pistol and shoots him. Adam and Rebecca are presumed to survive.

All the characters return in their pre-war attire to sing "Imagine This".

| Role | Original London Cast | UK National Amateur Premiere |
|---|---|---|
| Rebecca (Tamar) | Leila Benn Harris | Elly Taylor |
| Daniel (Eleazar) | Peter Polycarpou | Neil Richardson |
| Max (Jeremiah) | Sevan Stephan | David Gudgeons |
| Sarah (Naomi) | Sarah Ingram | Jenine Grover |
| Adolph (Caesar) | Bernard Lloyd | Peter Haynes |
| Lola (Salome) | Cameron Leigh | Caroline Redden |
| Jan (Aaron) | Steven Serlin | Martin Grover |
| Izzy (Pompey) | Michael Matus | Spencer Hawkes |
| Otto (Rufus) | Gary Milner | Frazer McDonald |
| Adam (Silva) | Simon Gleeson | Chris Squires |
| Captain Blick | Richard Cotton | Sebastian Goss |
| Leon (David) | Alexander Kalian/Jamie Davis/Nathan Attard | Louis Meminger |
| Jacob | Marc Antolin | Joel Wylie |
| Hannah | Rececca Sutherland | Carole Haynes |

(The Warsaw character names are followed by the Masada character names in brackets)

== Musical numbers ==
Prologue - Warsaw 1939–1942

- The Last Day of Summer — Rebecca, Daniel and Company

Act I
Warsaw 1942

- Imagine This — Daniel and Company

Jerusalem/Masada 70CE

- Masada Prologue — Rebels
- Rufus's Letter to Caesar — Rufus
- Free (Jerusalem Sequence) — Rebels
- When he looked in my eyes — Tamar

Rome, Imperial Palace

- Salome's Lament — Salome, Slave girls, Roman soldiers
- When I looked in her eyes — Silva
- No More — Pompey

Masada - Several Months Later

- Free (Reprise) — Rebels
- Rebels' Prayer — Tamar, Naomi and Rebels
- Masada — Eleazar, Tamar, Rebels
- Hail — Silva, Tamar, Roman Soldiers
- I am the dove — Naomi and Tamar
- Hail (Reprise) — Silva
- Far from here, Far from now — Silva, Tamar

Act II
Warsaw

- To touch a cloud — Daniel and Company
- The Last Laugh — Daniel

Masada

- Don't mind me — Pompey and Aaron
- Writing on the wall — Rufus and Roman Soldiers
- I Surrender — Tamar, Silva, Eleazar
- Far from here, Far from now (Reprise) — Tamar
- Passover Prayer — Jeremiah and Rebels
- The Choice — Eleazar, Tamar, Naomi and Rebels

Warsaw

- To touch a cloud (Reprise) — Company
- Imagine This (Finale) — Company

== Critical reception ==
In spite of several four-star reviews, including the Sunday Telegraph ("A Triumph" "I adore this show" "4-stars"), the London Paper ("A mesmerising journey"), London Lite ("Bursting with drama" - 4 stars), Spoonfed.co.uk ("It must be rated a triumph"), The West End Whingers ("We were humming the tunes the next day. Extraordinary") and others, the musical closed after two weeks of previews and a month of regular performances upon receiving generally poor reviews from the mainstream British critics, with "many papers attacking it for trivializing the Holocaust". The press questioned whether, during the current economic woes, audiences want to see such a dark story. Echoing a number of the reviews, a writer in The Guardian criticized the "cavalier" treatment of the subject and contended that critics were right to question whether "the Holocaust was being co-opted to legitimise and lend cachet to deficient art."
