= Timothy Sheader =

British theatre director (born 1971)

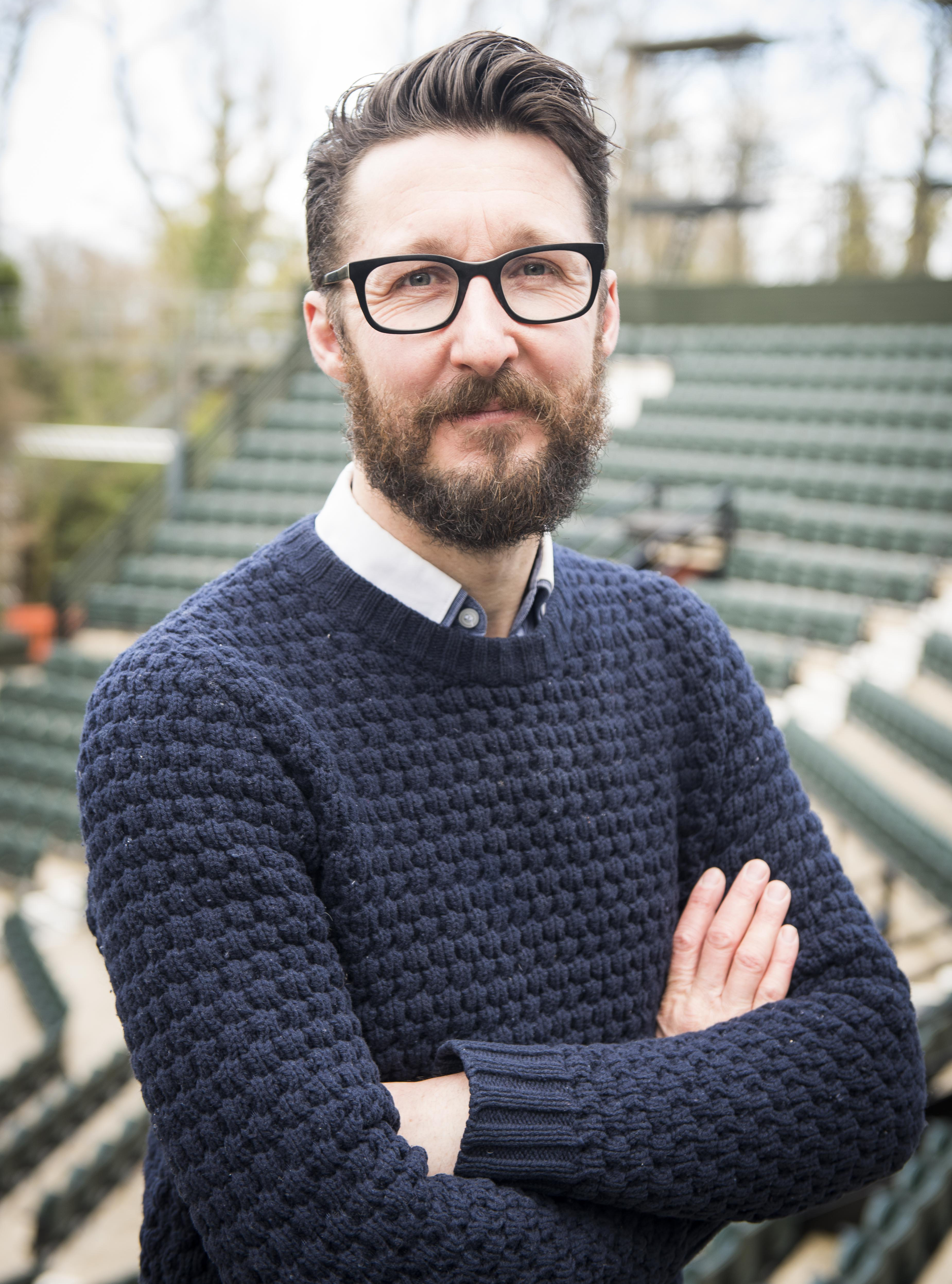
- Born: 23 November 1971; Scarborough, North Yorkshire
- Education: University of Birmingham; Orange Tree Theatre (Training)
- Occupation: Theatre director
- Years active: 2005-present

Timothy Sheader (born 23 November 1971 in Scarborough, North Yorkshire) is a British theatre director. Sheader read Law with French at the University of Birmingham before moving into a career in theatre. He was artistic director at Regent's Park Open Air Theatre from 2007 to 2024. He became artistic director of the Donmar Warehouse in 2024.

== Theatrical career ==
Sheader started his theatrical career as a trainee director at the Orange Tree Theatre in Richmond before becoming an assistant director with the Royal Shakespeare Company for two years. After directing at Regent's Park Open Air Theatre in 2005, he was appointed artistic director for the venue in November 2007, responsible for productions from the 2008 season.

Under Sheader’s tenure Open Air Theatre productions won seven Olivier Awards, three Evening Standard Awards and six WhatsOnStage Awards.

In 2008, A Midsummer Night’s Dream re-imagined for everyone aged six and over was the first of many Shakespeare plays specially adapted for younger audiences. Hello, Dolly! (2009) won three Olivier Awards, including Best Musical Revival; Into the Woods (2010) transferred to New York; Crazy For You (2011) was a double Olivier Award-winner and transferred to the West End; and To Kill a Mockingbird (2013/14) went on tour in the UK, ending at the Barbican in mid-2015.

Jesus Christ Superstar (2016) won the Olivier Award for Best Musical Revival and Evening Standard Award for Best Musical, and returned to the Open Air Theatre for an extended engagement in 2017 ahead of a run at the Lyric Opera of Chicago in spring 2018. It then played a season at the Barbican Theatre in 2019, ahead of a North American tour. In the summer of 2020 it was reconceived as Jesus Christ Superstar: The Concert, the first West End production to re-open during the coronavirus pandemic.

In March 2024, Sheader took over as artistic director of the Donmar Warehouse.

== As Director for Regent's Park Open Air Theatre ==
Year	Production
2005*	Twelfth Night
2008	Romeo and Juliet; Gigi
2009	Hello, Dolly! Much Ado About Nothing
2010	The Crucible; Into the Woods (co-director)
2011	Crazy For You; Lord of the Flies (co-director); Crazy For You West End
2012	Into the Woods New York (co-director); Ragtime the Musical
2013	To Kill a Mockingbird
2014	To Kill a Mockingbird; All My Sons; To Kill a Mockingbird Tour; The Gershwins' Porgy and Bess
2015	Lord of the Flies (& Tour) (co-director); J.M. Barrie’s Peter Pan (co-director); To Kill a Mockingbird Barbican
2016	Jesus Christ Superstar; Running Wild (co-director)
2017	Running Wild Tour (co-director); Jesus Christ Superstar; A Tale of Two Cities
2018	J.M. Barrie’s Peter Pan (co-director); The Turn of the Screw; Jesus Christ Superstar Chicago
2019	Jesus Christ Superstar Barbican; Hansel and Gretel
2020	Jesus Christ Superstar: The Concert
2021	Carousel
2022	101 Dalmations
2023	La Cage aux Folles

* Prior to his appointment as Artistic Director in 2007.

== Other work ==
In 2012, Sheader directed The Magistrate at London's National Theatre starring John Lithgow. In 2013, he worked with the Chichester Festival Theatre to direct a new production of Barnum, starring Christopher Fitzgerald. In 2015, he directed My Fair Lady at the Aarhus Teater in Denmark.

Other productions Sheader has directed include: Imagine This (New London); Hobson's Choice, The Clandestine Marriage, Love in a Maze (Watermill Theatre); Rodgers and Hammerstein's Cinderella, The Three Musketeers (Bristol Old Vic); The Star Throwers, Unless (Stephen Joseph Theatre, Scarborough); Misconceptions (Derby Playhouse); Streetcar to Tennessee (Young Vic); Achilles (Edinburgh Fringe First); Wild, Wild Women (Orange Tree); Arms and the Man (National Tour) Piaf, Sweet Charity (Sheffield Crucible). 2018 also saw Sheader's Jesus Christ Superstar play at Chicago's Lyric Opera. In 2019, Sheader made his Royal Opera House debut, directing the World Premiere of The Monstrous Child at the Royal Opera House. In 2024/25, he directed Natasha, Pierre & The Great Comet of 1812 at Donmar Warehouse.
