= WhatsOnStage Awards =

Theatre awards awarded by whatsonstage.com

- Current: 2025 WhatsOnStage Awards
- Awarded for: Achievements in British theatre
- Venue: The London Palladium
- Country: United Kingdom
- Presented by: WhatsOnStage.com
- First award: 2001

Television/radio coverage
- Network: BBC Radio 2 (2020)
- Produced by: Alex Wood, Darius Thompson, Alex Parker, Damian Sandys

The WhatsOnStage Awards (WOS Awards), formerly known as the Theatregoers' Choice Awards, are organised by the theatre website WhatsOnStage.com. The awards celebrate outstanding achievements in UK theatre, with categories covering both regional productions and shows in London's West End.

Distinctive among major theatre honours in the UK, the WhatsOnStage Awards are decided entirely by public vote. Theatre audiences nominate and select the winners, making the awards a reflection of popular opinion rather than industry panels or critics.

The ceremony is typically held each year in February or March. From 2012 to 2023, it took place at the Prince of Wales Theatre. Since 2024, the event has been hosted at The London Palladium, owned and run by Andrew Lloyd Webber.

The awards are currently produced by Alex Wood and Darius Thompson (for WhatsOnStage) with co-producers Alex Parker and Damian Sandys.

== History ==
The origins of the WhatsOnStage Awards date back to early 2001, when WhatsOnStage invited its readers to vote online for their preferred winners of that year’s Laurence Olivier Awards. Within two weeks, over 5,000 people participated, with the public’s choices diverging significantly from those of the official Olivier judging panel. Encouraged by the strong response, the site’s editors created independent shortlists for the 2002 awards. In 2003, WhatsOnStage hosted its first launch event to announce the shortlists to an audience of approximately 200 theatre industry guests. The awards continued to evolve, and in 2008, the first full-scale concert and ceremony was introduced to formally celebrate the winners.

Since 2023, WhatsOnStage adopted more inclusive awards by replacing gender-specific categories such as "Best Actor" and "Best Actress" with the gender-neutral "Best Performer" categories, reflecting a broader commitment to inclusivity in recognising performance talent.

== Judging ==
Each year thousands of theatregoers submit nominations online across more than 20 award categories. The official nominations are revealed at a high-profile launch event, typically held in early December.

Public voting then opens and continues through to the end of January. During the 2012–2013 awards season, over 60,000 theatre fans participated in the voting process, with leading contenders in several categories shifting frequently as votes were cast.

== Ceremony ==
=== Venues ===
The inaugural WhatsOnStage Awards launch party was held at The Venue, before relocating to the Dominion Theatre in 2004. In 2005 and 2006, the event took place at Planet Hollywood, followed by a move to Café de Paris, where it was held annually—with the exception of 2009, when the launch was hosted at the London Hippodrome as part of a campaign to preserve the venue as a performance space.

The first full-scale WhatsOnStage Awards concert and ceremony was introduced in 2008 at the 960-seat Lyric Theatre. In 2009, the event moved to the larger 1,100-seat Prince of Wales Theatre, where it sold out for four consecutive years from 2009 to 2012. The 2013 ceremony was held at the Palace Theatre, but the event returned to the Prince of Wales Theatre in 2014. Since 2024, the WhatsOnStage Awards have been staged at The London Palladium.

=== 2008 ===
The 2008 WhatsOnStage Awards concert and ceremony took place on 22 February at the Lyric Theatre and were hosted by James Corden and Sheridan Smith.

=== 2009 ===
The 2009 WhatsOnStage Awards concert and ceremony took place on 15 February at the Prince of Wales Theatre and were hosted by James Corden and Sheridan Smith.

=== 2010 ===
The 2010 WhatsOnStage Awards concert and ceremony took place on 14 February at the Prince of Wales Theatre and were hosted by Christopher Biggins and Mel Giedroyc.

=== 2011 ===
The 2011 WhatsOnStage Awards concert and ceremony took place on 19 February at the Prince of Wales Theatre and were hosted by Sheridan Smith, Christopher Biggins and Miranda Hart.

=== 2012 ===
The 2012 WhatsOnStage Awards concert and ceremony took place on 20 February at the Prince of Wales Theatre and were hosted by Sheridan Smith, Alan Davies and Jenny Eclair.

=== 2013 ===
The 2013 WhatsOnStage Awards concert and ceremony took place on 18 February at the Palace Theatre and were hosted by Mel Giedroyc and Rufus Hound.

=== 2014 ===
The 2014 WhatsOnStage Awards concert and ceremony took place on 22 February at the Prince of Wales Theatre and were hosted by Stephen Fry and Julian Clary.

=== 2015 ===
The 2015 WhatsOnStage Awards concert and ceremony took place on 15 February at the Prince of Wales Theatre and were hosted by Mel Giedroyc and Steve Furst.

=== 2016 ===
The 2016 WhatsOnStage Awards concert and ceremony took place on 21 February at the Prince of Wales Theatre and were hosted by Mel Giedroyc and Steve Furst.

=== 2017 ===
The 2017 WhatsOnStage Awards concert and ceremony took place on 19 February 2017 at the Prince of Wales Theatre and were hosted by Simon Lipkin and Vikki Stone.

=== 2018 ===
The 2018 WhatsOnStage Awards concert and ceremony took place on 25 February 2018 at the Prince of Wales Theatre and were hosted by Simon Lipkin and Vikki Stone.

=== 2019 ===
The 2019 WhatsOnStage Awards concert and ceremony took place on 3 March 2019 at the Prince of Wales Theatre and were hosted by Vicky Vox and Kobna Holdbrook-Smith.

=== 2020 ===
The 2020 WhatsOnStage Awards concert and ceremony took place on 1 March 2020 at the Prince of Wales Theatre and were hosted by Jodie Prenger and Tom Read Wilson. The event was broadcast live on BBC Radio 2, hosted by Elaine Paige and Paddy O'Connell.

=== 2021 ===
Due to the COVID-19 pandemic, the 2021 WhatsOnStage Awards were held virtually. They did not honour creatives as they traditionally did but instead recognised 21 members of the public who had supported the theatre industry during the pandemic.

=== 2022 ===
The 2022 WhatsOnStage Awards concert and ceremony were held on 27 February 2022 at the Prince of Wales Theatre and were hosted by Jodie Prenger and Tom Read Wilson.

=== 2023 ===
The 2023 WhatsOnStage Awards concert and ceremony were held on 12 February 2023 at the Prince of Wales Theatre and were hosted by Courtney Bowman, Laurie Kynaston and Billy Luke Nevers.

=== 2024 ===
The 2024 WhatsOnStage Awards concert and ceremony were held on 11 February 2024 at the London Palladium and were hosted by Bonnie Langford and Melanie La Barrie.

=== 2025 (The Silver Anniversary Concert) ===
The 2025 WhatsOnStage Awards concert and ceremony were held on 9 February 2025 at the London Palladium and were hosted for the first time by Gina Murray and Mazz Murray.

=== 2026 ===
The 2026 WhatsOnStage Awards concert and ceremony were held on 8 March 2026 at the London Palladium and were hosted for the second time by Gina Murray and Mazz Murray.

=== 2027 ===
The 2027 WhatsOnStage Awards concert and ceremony is scheduled to be held on 28 February 2027 at the London Palladium and is set to be hosted for the third time by Gina Murray and Mazz Murray.

== Current Award Categories ==
Performance categories

- SINE Digital Best Performer in a Play Award
- Best Performer in a Musical
- Best Supporting Performer in a Play
- Best Supporting Performer in a Musical
- Best Takeover Performance
- Best Professional Debut Performance
- Go Live Theatre Best Child Performance

Production categories

- Travelzoo Best New Musical Award
- Best Musical Revival
- Best New Play
- The Londoner Best Play Revival Award
- Best West End Show
- Audience Republic Best Regional Production
- Best Studio Production
- Best Concert Event
- Best Direction
- Best Casting Direction
- Best Choreography
- Preevue Best Set Design Award
- Best Costume Design
- White Light Best Lighting Design Award
- Best Sound Design
- Best Video Design
- Best Musical Direction/Supervision
- Best Wigs, Hair and Make-Up Design

Special categories

- AudienceView Services to UK Theatre

Defunct categories

- Best Actor in a Play
- Best Actress in a Play
- Best Supporting Actor in a Play
- Best Supporting Actress in a Play
- Best Actor in a Musical
- Best Actress in a Musical
- Best Supporting Actor In a Musical
- Best Supporting Actress In a Musical
- Best Solo Performance
- Best Ensemble Performance
- Theatre Event Of The Year
- Best Poster Design

== Recent winners ==
2008

- Best Actress in a Play: Maggie Smith – The Lady from Dubuque at the Theatre Royal Haymarket
- Best Actor in a Play: Ian McKellen – King Lear, RSC at the New London
- Best Supporting Actress in a Play: Diana Rigg – All About My Mother at the Old Vic
- Best Supporting Actor in a Play: Lee Evans – The Dumb Waiter at Trafalgar Studios
- Best Actress in a Musical: Leanne Jones – Hairspray at the Shaftesbury
- Best Actor in a Musical: Michael Ball – Hairspray at the Shaftesbury
- Best Supporting Actress in a Musical: Tracie Bennett – Hairspray at the Shaftesbury
- Best Supporting Actor in a Musical: Ben James-Ellis – Hairspray at the Shaftesbury
- Best Solo Performance: Fiona Shaw – Happy Days at the NT Lyttelton
- Best Ensemble Performance: The Taming of the Shrew & Twelfth Night – Propeller at the Old Vic
- Best Takeover in a Role: Kerry Ellis – Wicked at the Apollo Victoria
- Best New Play: All About My Mother by Samuel Adamson – at the Old Vic
- Best New Comedy: Elling by Simon Bent – at the Bush & Trafalgar Studios
- Best New Musical: Hairspray by Marc Shaiman, Scott Whittman, Mark O'Donnell & Thomas Meehan – at the Shaftesbury
- Best Play Revival: Equus – at the Gielgud
- Best Musical Revival: Joseph & the Amazing Technicolor Dreamcoat – at the Adelphi
- The Best Shakespearean Production: Macbeth – at the Gielgud
- Best Director: Jack O'Brien – Hairspray at the Shaftesbury
- Best Set Designer: Rob Howell – The Lord of the Rings at the Theatre Royal Drury Lane
- Best Choreographer: Jerry Mitchell – Hairspray at the Shaftesbury
- London Newcomer of the Year: Daniel Radcliffe – Equus at the Gielgud
- Best Off West End Production: A Christmas Carol & The Magic Flute – at the Young Vic and I Love You Because – at the Landor
- Best Regional Production: Pygmalion – at the Theatre Royal Bath & on tour
- Theatre Event of the Year: Daniel Radcliffe's steamy publicity shots for Equus

2009

- Best Actress in a Play: Katy Stephens – The Histories, RSC at the Roundhouse
- Best Actor in a Play: Kenneth Branagh – Ivanov, Donmar West End at Wyndham's
- Best Supporting Actress in a Play: Sophie Thompson – The Female of the Species at the Vaudeville
- Best Supporting Actor in a Play: Tom Hiddleston – Othello at the Donmar Warehouse & Ivanov, Donmar West End at Wyndham's
- Best Actress in a Musical: Sofia Escobar – West Side Story at Sadler's Wells
- Best Actor in a Musical: Ryan Molloy – Jersey Boys at the Prince Edward
- Best Supporting Actress in a Musical: Tracie Bennett – La Cage aux Folles at the Playhouse
- Best Supporting Actor in a Musical: Stephen Ashfield – Jersey Boys at the Prince Edward
- Best Solo Performance: Eddie Izzard – Stripped at the Lyric
- Best Ensemble Performance: Into the Hoods – at the Novello
- Best Takeover in a Role: Daniel Boys – Avenue Q at the Noël Coward
- Books Best New Play: Under the Blue Sky by David Eldridge – at the Duke of York's
- Best New Comedy: Fat Pig by Neil LaBute – at Trafalgar Studios & the Comedy
- Best New Musical: Jersey Boys by Bob Gaudio, Bob Crewe, Rick Elice & Marshall Brickman – at the Prince Edward
- Best Play Revival: Ivanov, Donmar West End – at Wyndham's
- Best Musical Revival: West Side Story – at Sadler's Wells
- Best Shakespearean Production: Othello – at the Donmar Warehouse
- Best Director: Michael Grandage – Othello & The Chalk Garden at the Donmar Warehouse & Ivanov, Donmar West End at Wyndham's
- Best Set Designer: Klara Zieglerova – Jersey Boys at the Prince Edward
- Best Lighting Designer: Malcolm Rippeth – Brief Encounter at The Cinema, Haymarket & Six Characters in Search of an Author at the Gielgud
- Best Choreographer: Lynne Page – La Cage aux Folles at the Menier Chocolate Factory & Playhouse
- London Newcomer of the Year: Josh Hartnett – Rain Man at the Apollo
- Best Off West End Production: Come Dancing – at Theatre Royal Stratford East
- Best Regional Production: Hamlet – RSC at the Courtyard Theatre, Stratford-upon-Avon
- Theatre Event of the Year: David Tennant returning to the stage in Hamlet for the RSC

2010

- Best Actress in a Play: Rachel Weisz - A Streetcar Named Desire at the Donmar Warehouse
- Best Actor in a Play: Jude Law - Hamlet, Donmar West End at Wyndham's
- Best Supporting Actress in a Play: Miriam Margolyes - Endgame at the Duchess
- Best Supporting Actor in a Play: Patrick Stewart - Hamlet, RSC at the Novello
- Best Actress in a Musical: Patina Miller - Sister Act at the London Palladium
- Best Actor in a Musical: Rowan Atkinson - Oliver! at the Theatre Royal Drury Lane
- Best Supporting Actress in a Musical: Jodie Prenger - Oliver! at the Theatre Royal Drury Lane
- Best Supporting Actor in a Musical: Oliver Thornton - Priscilla, Queen of the Desert at the Palace
- Best Solo Performance: Derren Brown - Derren Brown: Enigma at the Adelphi
- Best Ensemble Performance: On the Waterfront at the Theatre Royal Haymarket
- Best Takeover in a Role: John Barrowman - La Cage aux Folles at the Playhouse
- Best New Play: Jerusalem by Jez Butterworth at the Royal Court Downstairs
- Best New Comedy: Calendar Girls by Tim Firth at the Noël Coward
- Best New Musical: Priscilla, Queen of the Desert by Allan Scott & Stephan Elliott at the Palace
- Best Play Revival: A Streetcar Named Desire at the Donmar Warehouse
- Best Musical Revival: Oliver! at the Theatre Royal Drury Lane
- Best Shakespearean Production: Hamlet - RSC at the Novello
- Best Director: Trevor Nunn - Inherit the Wind at the Old Vic & A Little Night Music at the Menier Chocolate Factory & Garrick
- Best Set Designer: Brian Thomson - Priscilla, Queen of the Desert at the Palace
- Best Lighting Designer: Natasha Katz - Sister Act at the London Palladium at The Cinema, Haymarket, & Six Characters in Search of an Author at the Gielgud
- Best Choreographer: Ross Coleman - Priscilla, Queen of the Desert at the Palace
- London Newcomer of the Year: Diana Vickers - The Rise & Fall of Little Voice at the Vaudeville
- Best Off West End Production: The Pirates of Penzance at the Union Theatre
- Best Regional Production: Adolf Hitler: My Part in His Downfall Bristol Old Vic & tour
- Best West End Show: Wicked
- Theatre Event of the Year: The pairing of Ian McKellen and Patrick Stewart in Waiting for Godot

2011

- Best Actress in a Play: Zoe Wanamaker - All My Sons at the Apollo
- Best Actor in a Play: David Suchet - All My Sons at the Apollo
- Best Supporting Actress in a Play: Tamsin Greig - The Little Dog Laughed at the Garrick
- Best Supporting Actor in a Play: Patrick Stewart - Hamlet, RSC at the Novello
- Best Actress in a Musical: Sheridan Smith - Legally Blonde at the Savoy
- Best Actor in a Musical: Ramin Karimloo - Love Never Dies at the Adelphi
- Best Supporting Actress in a Musical: Jill Halfpenny - Legally Blonde at the Savoy
- Best Supporting Actor in a Musical: Joseph Millson - Love Never Dies at the Adelphi
- Best Solo Performance: Meera Syal - Shirley Valentine at the Menier Chocolate Factory & Trafalgar Studios 1
- Best Ensemble Performance: Les Misérables 25th anniversary concert – the company of companies – at The O2
- Best Takeover in a Role: Rachel Tucker - Wicked at the Apollo Victoria
- Best New Play: Anne Boleyn by Howard Brenton – at Shakespeare's Globe
- Best New Comedy: Yes, Prime Minister by Antony Jay & Jonathan Lynn – at the Gielgud
- Best New Musical: Legally Blonde - by Nell Benjamin, Laurence O'Keefe & Heather Hach – at the Savoy
- Best Play Revival: Cat on a Hot Tin Roof at the Novello
- Best Musical Revival: Les Misérables 25th anniversary production at the Barbican
- Best Shakespearean Production: Hamlet at the National, Olivier
- Best Director: Timothy Sheader Into the Woods & The Crucible at the Open Air
- Best Set Designer: Joanna Scotcher - The Railway Children at Waterloo Station
- Best Lighting Designer: James Farncombe Ghost Stories at the Lyric Hammersmith & Duke of York's
- Best Choreographer: Jerry Mitchell - Legally Blonde at the Savoy
- London Newcomer of the Year: Jonathan Groff - Deathtrap at the Noël Coward
- Best Off West End Production: La Bohème at the Cock Tavern, Kilburn & Soho
- Best Regional Production: Chess on tour
- Best West End Show: Wicked
- Theatre Event of the Year: Les Misérables 25th anniversary concert at The 02 & screened to cinemas worldwide

2012

- Best Actress in a Play: Vanessa Redgrave - Driving Miss Daisy at Wyndham's
- Best Actor in a Play: James Corden - One Man, Two Guvnors at the National, Lyttelton & Adelphi
- Best Supporting Actress in a Play: Catherine Tate - Season's Greetings at the National, Lyttelton
- Best Supporting Actor in a Play: Oliver Chris - One Man, Two Guvnors at the National, Lyttelton & Adelphi
- Best Actress in a Musical: Amanda Holden - Shrek the Musical at the Theatre Royal Drury Lane
- Best Actor in a Musical: Richard Fleeshman - Ghost the Musical at the Piccadilly
- Best Supporting Actress in a Musical: Hannah Waddingham - The Wizard of Oz at the London Palladium
- Best Supporting Actor in a Musical: Nigel Harman - Shrek the Musical at the Theatre Royal Drury Lane
- Best Solo Performance: Kerry Ellis - Anthems at the Royal Albert Hall
- Best Ensemble Performance: London Road - at the National, Cottesloe
- Best Takeover in a Role: Alfie Boe - Les Misérables at the Queen's
- Best New Play: Three Days in May by Ben Brown - at Trafalgar Studios 1
- Best New Comedy: One Man, Two Guvnors by Richard Bean - at the National, Lyttelton & Adelphi
- Best New Musical: Priscilla, Queen of the Desert by Allan Scott & Stephan Elliott at the Palace
- Best Play Revival: Driving Miss Daisy at Wyndham's
- Best Musical Revival: The Wizard of Oz at the London Palladium
- Best Shakespearean Production: Much Ado About Nothing at Wyndham's
- Best Director: Danny Boyle - Frankenstein at the National, Olivier
- Best Set Designer: Rob Howell - Ghost the Musical at the Piccadilly & Matilda the Musical at the Cambridge
- Best Lighting Designer: Hugh Vanstone - Ghost the Musical at the Piccadilly
- Best Choreographer: Peter Darling - Matilda the Musical at the Cambridge
- London Newcomer of the Year: Tim Minchin - Matilda the Musical at the Cambridge
- Best Off West End Production: The Riots - at the Tricycle
- Best Regional Production: Sweeney Todd at Chichester Festival
- Best West End Show: War Horse
- Theatre Event of the Year: David Tennant & Catherine Tate reuniting on stage in Much Ado About Nothing

2013

- Best Actress in a Play: Sheridan Smith – Hedda Gabler at the Old Vic
- Best Actor in a Play: Rupert Everett – The Judas Kiss at the Hampstead
- Best Supporting Actress in a Play: Natalie Casey - Abigail's Party at the Menier Chocolate Factor & Wyndham's
- Best Supporting Actor in a Play: Stephen Fry – Twelfth Night at Shakespeare's Globe & the Apollo
- Best Actress in a Musical: Imelda Staunton – Sweeney Todd at the Adelphi
- Best Actor in a Musical: Michael Ball – Sweeney Todd at the Adelphi
- Best Supporting Actress in a Musical: Melanie C – Jesus Christ Superstar at the O2
- Best Supporting Actor in a Musical: Tim Minchin – Jesus Christ Superstar at the O2
- Best Solo Performance: Idina Menzel – Idina Menzel at the Apollo
- Best Ensemble Performance: Richard III & Twelfth Night – at Shakespeare's Globe & the Apollo
- Best Takeover in a Role: Ramin Karimloo – Les Misérables at the Queen's
- Best New Play: The Curious Incident of the Dog in the Night-time by Simon Stephens – at the National, Cottesloe
- Best New Comedy: The Ladykillers by Graham Linehan – at the Gielgud
- Best New Musical: The Bodyguard by Alex Dinelaris – at the Adelphi
- Best Play Revival: Abigail's Party – at the Menier Chocolate Factory & Wyndham's
- Best Musical Revival: Sweeney Todd – at the Adelphi
- Best Shakespearean Production: Twelfth Night – at Shakespeare's Globe & the Apollo
- Best Director: Jonathan Kent – Sweeney Todd at the Adelphi
- Best Set Designer: Tom Scutt – The Lion, the Witch & the Wardrobe at Kensington Gardens & Constellations at the Royal Court Upstairs & Duke of York's
- Best Lighting Designer: Mark Henderson – Sweeney Todd at the Adelphi
- Best Choreographer: Andrew Wright – Singin' in the Rain at the Palace
- Best Original Music: Sweet Smell of Success – Marvin Hamlisch at the Arcola
- London Newcomer of the Year: Will Young – Cabaret at the Savoy
- Best Off West End Production: Taboo – at the Brixton Club House
- Best Regional Production: American Idiot – on tour
- Best West End Show: Les Misérables – at the Queen's Theatre
- Theatre Event of the Year: Danny Boyle's Olympics Opening Ceremony

2014

- Best Actress in a Play: Dame Helen Mirren in The Audience
- Best Actor in a Play: Daniel Radcliffe in The Cripple of Inishmaan
- Best Supporting Actress in a Play: Haydn Gwynne in The Audience
- Best Supporting Actor in a Play: David Walliams in A Midsummer Night's Dream
- Best Actress in a Musical: Scarlett Strallen in A Chorus Line and Candide
- Best Actor in a Musical: Gavin Creel in The Book of Mormon
- Best Supporting Actress in a Musical: Alexia Khadime in The Book of Mormon
- Best Supporting Actor in a Musical: Stephen Ashfield in The Book of Mormon
- Best Solo Performance: Barry Humphries in Eat Pray Laugh!
- Best Ensemble Performance: A Chorus Line at the London Palladium
- Best Takeover in a Role: Carrie Hope Fletcher in Les Misérables
- Best New Play: The Audience by Peter Morgan
- Best New Comedy: The Play That Goes Wrong by Henry Shields, Henry Lewis and Jonathan Sayer
- Best New Musical: The Book of Mormon at the Prince of Wales Theatre
- Best Play Revival: To Kill A Mockingbird at the Open Air Theatre
- Best Musical Revival: The Sound of Music at the Open Air Theatre
- Best Shakespearean Production: A Midsummer Night's Dream at the Noël Coward Theatre
- Best Director: Michael Grandage for the Michael Grandage Season
- Best Set Designer: Mark Thompson for Charlie and the Chocolate Factory
- Best Lighting Designer: Adam Silverman for Macbeth
- Best Choreographer: Peter Darling for Charlie and the Chocolate Factory
- Best Original Music: Once by Glen Hansard and Marketa Irglova
- London Newcomer of the Year: Rupert Grint in Mojo
- Best Off West End Production: Titanic at Southwark Playhouse
- Best Regional Production: My Fair Lady at the Crucible
- Best West End Show: Matilda the Musical
- Theatre Event of the Year: National Theatre's 50th anniversary gala

2015

- Best Actress in a Play: Billie Piper in Great Britain
- Best Actor in a Play: David Tennant in Richard II
- Best Supporting Actress in a Play: Vanessa Kirby in A Streetcar Named Desire
- Best Supporting Actor in a Play: Mark Gatiss in Coriolanus
- Best Actress in a Musical: Eva Noblezada in Miss Saigon
- Best Actor in a Musical: Jon Jon Briones in Miss Saigon
- Best Supporting Actress in a Musical: Rachelle Ann Go in Miss Saigon
- Best Supporting Actor in a Musical: Kwang Ho Hong in Miss Saigon
- Best Takeover in a Role: Kerry Ellis for Wicked
- Best New Play: Shakespeare in Love
- Best New Musical: Memphis
- Best Play Revival: Coriolanus
- Best Musical Revival: Miss Saigon
- Best Director: Laurence Connor for Miss Saigon
- Best Set Designer: Totie Driver & Matt Kinley for Miss Saigon
- Best Lighting Designer: Mark Henderson for Coriolanus
- Best Choreographer: Bob Avian & Geoffrey Garratt for Miss Saigon
- Best Off West End Production: Sweeney Todd at Twickenham Theatre
- Best Regional Production: Oliver! at Sheffield Theatres
- Best West End Show: Miss Saigon

2016

- Best Actress in a Play: Nicole Kidman for Photograph 51
- Best Actor in a Play: Benedict Cumberbatch for Hamlet
- Best Supporting Actress in a Play: Judi Dench, The Winter's Tale
- Best Supporting Actor in a Play: Mark Gatiss, Three Days in the Country
- Best Actress in a Musical: Imelda Staunton, Gypsy
- Best Actor in a Musical: Matt Henry, Kinky Boots
- Best Supporting Actress in a Musical: Lara Pulver, Gypsy
- Best Supporting Actor in a Musical: David Bedella, In The Heights
- Best New Play: Photograph 51 by Anna Ziegler
- Best New Musical: Kinky Boots at the Adelphi Theatre
- Best Play Revival: Hamlet at the Barbican
- Best Musical Revival: Gypsy at the Savoy Theatre
- Best Director: Jonathan Kent for Gypsy
- Best Choreographer: Jerry Mitchell for Kinky Boots
- Best Set Designer: Es Devlin for Hamlet
- Best Lighting Designer: Jane Cox for Hamlet
- Best Off West End Production: Carrie at Southwark Playhouse
- Best Regional Production: Mary Poppins, UK tour
- Best West End Show: Les Misérables
- Equity Award for Services to Theatre: Kenneth Branagh

2017

- Best Actress in a Play: Billie Piper for Yerma
- Best Actor in a Play: Jamie Parker for Harry Potter and the Cursed Child
- Best Supporting Actress in a Play: Noma Dumezweni for Harry Potter and the Cursed Child
- Best Supporting Actor in a Play: Anthony Boyle for Harry Potter and the Cursed Child
- Best Actress in a Musical: Amber Riley for Dreamgirls
- Best Actor in a Musical: Charlie Stemp for Half a Sixpence
- Best Supporting Actress in a Musical: Emma Williams for Half a Sixpence
- Best Supporting Actor in a Musical: Trevor Dion Nicholas for Disney's Aladdin
- Best New Play: Harry Potter and the Cursed Child
- Best New Musical: School of Rock
- Best Play Revival: No Man's Land
- Best Musical Revival: Funny Girl
- Best Director: John Tiffany for Harry Potter and the Cursed Child
- Best Set Designer: Christine Jones for Harry Potter and the Cursed Child
- Best Lighting Designer: Neil Austin for Harry Potter and the Cursed Child
- Best Video Design: Finn Ross and Ash Woodward for Harry Potter and the Cursed Child
- Best Choreographer: Andrew Wright for Half a Sixpence
- Best Off West End Production: The Last Five Years, St James Theatre
- Best Regional Production: The Girls, National tour
- Best West End Show: Wicked and Les Misérables
- Equity Award for Services to Theatre: Cameron Mackintosh

2018

- Best Actress in a Play: Olivia Colman for Mosquitoes
- Best Actor in a Play: David Tennant for Don Juan in Soho
- Best Supporting Actress in a Play: Juliet Stevenson for Hamlet
- Best Supporting Actor in a Play: Fra Fee for The Ferryman
- Best Actress in a Musical: Carrie Hope Fletcher for The Addams Family
- Best Actor in a Musical: John McCrea for Everybody's Talking About Jamie
- Best Supporting Actress in a Musical: Lucie Shorthouse for Everybody's Talking About Jamie
- Best Supporting Actor in a Musical: Ross Noble for Young Frankenstein
- Best New Play: The Ferryman
- Best New Musical: Everybody's Talking About Jamie
- Best Play Revival: Hamlet
- Best Musical Revival: 42nd Street
- Best Director: Sam Mendes for The Ferryman
- Best Set Designer: Douglas W, Schmidt for 42nd Street
- Best Lighting Designer: Patrick Woodroffe for Bat Out of Hell
- Best Video Design: 59 Productions for An American in Paris
- Best Choreographer: Randy Skinner for 42nd Street
- Best Off West End Production: Hair, The Vaults
- Best Regional Production: Sunset Boulevard, National tour
- Best Original Cast Recording: Les Misérables
- Best Show Poster: Harry Potter and the Cursed Child
- Best West End Show: Harry Potter and the Cursed Child
- Equity Award for Services to Theatre: Sonia Friedman

2019

- Best Actress in a Play: Sophie Okonedo for Anthony and Cleopatra
- Best Actor in a Play: Aidan Turner for The Lieutenant of Inishmore
- Best Supporting Actress in a Play: Vanessa Redgrave for The Inheritance
- Best Supporting Actor in a Play: Adrian Scarborough for The Madness of George III
- Best Actress in a Musical: Carrie Hope Fletcher for Heathers
- Best Actor in a Musical: Jamael Westman for Hamilton
- Best Supporting Actress in a Musical: Patti LuPone for Company
- Best Supporting Actor in a Musical: Jason Pennycooke for Hamilton
- Best New Play: The Inheritance
- Best New Musical: Heathers
- Best Play Revival: The Madness of George III
- Best Musical Revival: Little Shop of Horrors
- Best Director: Marianne Elliott for Company
- Best Set Designer: Tom Scutt for Little Shop of Horrors
- Best Costume Designer: Paul Tazewell for Hamilton
- Best Lighting Designer: Howell Binkley for Hamilton
- Best Video Design: Terry Scruby for Chess
- Best Choreographer: Andy Blankenbuehler for Hamilton
- Best Off West End Production: Six
- Best Regional Production: Spring Awakening
- Best Original Cast Recording: Everybody’s Talking About Jamie
- Best Show Poster: Little Shop of Horrors
- Best West End Show: Les Misérables
- Equity Award for Services to Theatre: Michael Grandage

2020

- Best Actress in a Play: Claire Foy for Lungs
- Best Actor in a Play: Andrew Scott for Present Laughter
- Best Supporting Actress in a Play: Sophie Thompson for Present Laughter
- Best Supporting Actor in a Play: Hammed Animashaun for A Midsummer Night's Dream
- Best Actress in a Musical: Miriam-Teak Lee for & Juliet
- Best Actor in a Musical: Sam Tutty for Dear Evan Hansen
- Best Supporting Actress in a Musical: Rachel Tucker for Come From Away
- Best Supporting Actor in a Musical: Jack Loxton for Dear Evan Hansen
- Best New Play: Life of Pi
- Best New Musical: Come From Away
- Best Play Revival: Betrayal
- Best Musical Revival: Mary Poppins
- Best Director: Jamie Lloyd for Evita
- Best Musical Direction: Ian Eisendrath, Alan Berry and team for Come From Away
- Best Choreographer: Kelly Devine for Come From Away
- Best Sound Designer: Gareth Owen for Come From Away
- Best Set Designer: Soutra Gilmour for & Juliet
- Best Costume Designer: Paloma Young for & Juliet
- Best Lighting Designer: Howard Hudson for & Juliet
- Best Video Design: Andrzej Goulding for & Juliet
- Best Graphic Design: DeWynters for & Juliet
- BBC Radio 2 Audience Award for Best Musical: Six
- Best Regional Production: The Color Purple
- Best Off-West End Production: Falsettos
- Equity Award for Services to Theatre: Lizzie Berrington and Polly Kemp (ERA 50:50)

2022

Main article: 2022 WhatsOnStage Awards
- Best performer in a male identifying role in a musical: Eddie Redmayne - Cabaret, Playhouse Theatre, London
- Best performer in a female identifying role in a musical: Carrie Hope Fletcher - Andrew Lloyd Webber's Cinderella, Gillian Lynne Theatre, London
- Best supporting performer in a male identifying role in a musical: Hugh Coles - Back to the Future: the Musical, Manchester Opera House and Adelphi Theatre, London
- Best supporting performer in a female identifying role in a musical: Carly Mercedes Dyer - Anything Goes, Barbican Centre, London
- Best performer in a male identifying role in a play: James McAvoy - Cyrano de Bergerac, Playhouse Theatre, London
- Best performer in a female identifying role in a play: Lily Allen - 2:22 A Ghost Story, Noel Coward Theatre, London
- Best supporting performer in a male identifying role in a play: Jake Wood - 2:22 A Ghost Story
- Best supporting performer in a female identifying role in a play: Akiya Henry - The Tragedy of Macbeth, Almeida Theatre, London
- Best new musical: Back to the Future the Musical
- Best musical revival: Anything Goes
- Best new play: 2:22 A Ghost Story
- Best play revival: Cyrano de Bergerac
- Best off-West End production: My Son's A Queer but What Can You Do? - The Turbine Theatre
- Best regional theatre production: Rent - Hope Mill Theatre, Manchester
- Best West End show: Six - Vaudeville Theatre
- Best direction: Michael Grandage - Frozen, Theatre Royal Drury Lane, London
- Best choreography: Rob Ashford - Frozen
- Best set design: Christopher Oram - Frozen
- Best costume design: Christopher Oram - Frozen
- Best lighting design: Tim Lutkin - Back to the Future the Musical
- Best musical direction or supervision: Stephen Oremus - Frozen
- Best sound design: Gareth Owen - Back to the Future the Musical
- Best video design: Finn Ross - Frozen
- Best graphic design: Bob King Creative - Frozen

2023

- Best performer in a musical: Courtney Bowman - Legally Blonde, Regent's Park Open Air Theatre, London
- Best supporting performer in a musical: Lauren Drew - Legally Blonde, Regent's Park Open Air Theatre, London
- Best performer in a play: Jodie Comer - Prima Facie, Harold Pinter Theatre, London
- Best supporting performer in a play: Gwyneth Keyworth - To Kill a Mockingbird, Gielgud Theatre, London
- Best takeover performance: Lucie Jones - Wicked, Apollo Victoria Theatre, London
- Best professional debut performance: Joe Locke - The Trials, Donmar Warehouse, London
- Best new musical: Bonnie & Clyde
- Best musical revival: Oklahoma!
- Best new play: Prima Facie
- Best play revival: Cock
- Best off-West End production: But I'm a Cheerleader - The Turbine Theatre, London
- Best regional theatre production: Billy Elliot - The Curve Theatre, Leicester
- Best West End show: Six - Vaudeville Theatre
- Best concert event: Stephen Sondheim's Old Friends - Gielgud Theatre, London
- Best direction: Phelim McDermott - My Neighbour Totoro, Gillian Lynne Theatre, London
- Best musical direction and supervision: Bruce O'Neil and Matt Smith - My Neighbour Totoro, Gillian Lynne Theatre, London
- Best casting: Pippa Ailion and Natalie Gallacher - Spring Awakening
- Best choreography: Arlene Phillips - Grease
- Best set design: Tom Pye and Basil Twist - My Neighbour Totoro
- Best costume design: Gabriella Slade - The Cher Show
- Best lighting design: Jessica Hung Han Yun - My Neighbour Totoro
- Best sound design: Tony Gayle - My Neighbour Totoro
- Best video design: Finn Ross - Oklahoma!
- Best graphic design: Studio Doug - Prima Facie

2024

- Best performer in a musical: Nicole Scherzinger - Sunset Boulevard, Savoy Theatre, London
- Best supporting performer in a musical: Jack Wolfe - Next to Normal, Wyndham's Theatre, London
- Best performer in a play: James Norton - A Little Life, Harold Pinter Theatre and Savoy Theatre, London
- Best supporting performer in a play: Luke Thompson - A Little Life, Harold Pinter Theatre and Savoy Theatre, London
- Best takeover performance: Aimee Lou Wood - Cabaret, Playhouse Theatre (a.k.a. The Kit Kat Club)
- Best professional debut performance: Grace Hodgett-Young - Sunset Boulevard, Savoy Theatre, London
- Best new musical: Operation Mincemeat
- Best musical revival: Guys and Dolls
- Best new play: Stranger Things: The First Shadow
- Best play revival: VANYA
- Best off-West End production: Flowers for Mrs Harris - Riverside Studios, London
- Best regional theatre production: The Lord of the Rings - Theatre Royal, Plymouth
- Best West End show: Cabaret - Playhouse Theatre (a.k.a. The Kit Kat Club)
- Best concert event: Love Never Dies - Theatre Royal Drury Lane, London
- Best direction: Jamie Lloyd - Sunset Boulevard, Savoy Theatre, London
- Best musical direction and supervision: Alan Williams - Sunset Boulevard, Savoy Theatre, London
- Best casting: Jill Green - The Little Big Things
- Best choreography: Matt Cole - Newsies
- Best set design: Bunny Christie - - Guys and Dolls
- Best costume design: Ryan Dawson Laight - La Cage aux Folles
- Best lighting design: Jack Knowles - Sunset Boulevard
- Best sound design: Adam Fisher - Sunset Boulevard
- Best video design: Nathan Amzi and Joe Ransom - Sunset Boulevard
- Best graphic design: Muse Creative - Guys and Dolls
- Equity Award for Services to Theatre: - Rufus Norris

2025

- Best performer in a musical: Imelda Staunton - Hello, Dolly!, The London Palladium, London
- Best supporting performer in a musical: Melanie La Barrie - Hadestown, Lyric Theatre, London
- Best performer in a play: David Tennant - Macbeth, Harold Pinter Theatre, London
- Best supporting performer in a play: Freema Agyeman - Romeo and Juliet, The Duke of York's Theatre, London
- Best takeover performance: Layton Williams - Cabaret, Playhouse Theatre (a.k.a. The Kit Kat Club)
- Best professional debut performance: Jeevan Braich - Starlight Express, Troubadour Wembley Park Theatre, London
- Best new musical: Mean Girls
- Best musical revival: Starlight Express
- Best new play: Spirited Away
- Best play revival: Macbeth
- Best off-West End production: Diary of a Gay Disaster - The Turbine Theatre, London
- Best regional theatre production: Oliver! - Chichester Festival Theatre, Chichester, West Sussex
- Best West End show: Six - Vaudeville Theatre
- Best concert event: Something Rotten! in Concert - Theatre Royal Drury Lane, London
- Best direction: Emma Rice - The Buddha of Suburbia, Barbican Centre, London
- Best musical direction and supervision: Tarek Merchant and Liam Robinson - Hadestown, Lyric Theatre, London
- Best casting: Harry Blumenau and Sarah-Jane Price - Why Am I So Single?
- Best choreography: Christopher Wheeldon - MJ the Musical
- Best set design: Tim Hatley - Starlight Express
- Best costume design: Gabriella Slade - Starlight Express
- Best wigs, hair and make-up design: Jackie Saundercock and Campbell Young Associates - Starlight Express
- Best lighting design: Howard Hudson - Starlight Express
- Best sound design: Gareth Fry - Macbeth
- Best video design: Andrzej Goulding - Starlight Express
- Equity Award for Services to Theatre: - Paule Constable (Lighting Designer)

== Past winners ==
- WhatsOnStage Awards Results - 2001
- WhatsOnStage Awards Results - 2002
- WhatsOnStage Awards Results - 2003
- WhatsOnStage Awards Results - 2004
- WhatsOnStage Awards Results - 2005
- WhatsOnStage Awards Results - 2006
- WhatsOnStage Awards Results - 2007
- WhatsOnStage Awards Results - 2008
- WhatsOnStage Awards Results - 2009
- WhatsOnStage Awards Results - 2010
- WhatsOnStage Awards Results - 2011
- WhatsOnStage Awards Results - 2012
- WhatsOnStage Awards Results - 2013

== See also ==
- WhatsOnStage.com
- Laurence Olivier Awards
- Black British Theatre Awards
