= Leila Benn Harris =

British actor and singer

- Born: 1983 (age 41–42)
- Occupation(s): Actress, soprano singer

Leila Benn Harris (born 1983) is a British actress and soprano singer. She trained at Arts Educational School in London and graduated with a BA in Musical Theatre. Upon graduation, she was cast in the lead role of Carmen in the No.1 National Tour of Fame. She then made her West-End debut in the same role at the Aldwych Theatre. She understudied and played the role of The Mistress in Andrew Lloyd Webber's West-End revival of Evita at the Adelphi Theatre, directed by Michael Grandage. She was also part of the original cast recording.

Leila then starred as Christine in The Phantom of the Opera at Her Majesty's Theatre, for which she was nominated for a 2008 Whatsonstage.com Theatregoers’ Choice Award for Best Takeover in a Role. To follow, Leila starred in the 2008 Production Imagine This at the New London Theatre in the title role of Rebecca, for which she was nominated for her second 2008 Whatsonstage.com Theatregoers' Choice Award, this time for Best Leading Actress in a Musical.

Other theatre performances include: the title role of Emily in From Up Here at Trafalgar Studios 2 and Liberation Day at The National Theatre Studio.

She completed several workshops of the Cat Stevens musical Moonshadow in which she played the lead role of Anees, and appeared in Chess in Concert with Idina Menzel & Josh Groban, to be released on DVD.

She then completed the run of John Doyle's revival of Oklahoma! at The Chichester Festival Theatre -playing the title role of Laurey.

Then, she appeared in the critically acclaimed Enron at The Noël Coward Theatre in association with The Royal Court, directed by Rupert Goold.

== Stage credits ==
=== Plays ===
- Enron (Newsreader/Prostitute), Noël Coward Theatre and National UK Tour

=== Musicals ===
- Les Miserables (Eponine), MCC Malta
- Evita, Adelphi Theatre
- The Phantom of the Opera (Christine), Her Majesty's Theatre

2008 Whatsonstage.com Theatregoers Choice Nomination - Best Takeover in a Role

- Imagine This (Rebecca), New London Theatre

2008 Whatsonstage.com Theatregoers Choice Nomination - Best Leading Actress in a Musical

- Oklahoma! (Laurey), Chichester Festival Theatre
- Liberation Day, The National Theatre Studio
- From Up Here (Emily), Trafalgar Studios 2

=== Television ===
- Manchild (Chica), BBC
- Identity, BBC

=== Radio ===
- Friday Night Is Music Night, BBC

=== Discography ===
Year	Show	Role		
2006		2009	Imagine This (Original London Cast Recording)	Rebecca (Tamar)
