= Take Flight (musical) =

- Original London Cast Recording
- Music: David Shire
- Lyrics: Richard Maltby, Jr.
- Book: John Weidman
- Basis: The pioneers of flight: the Wright Brothers, Charles Lindbergh and Amelia Earhart
- Productions: 2007 Menier Chocolate Factory, London

Take Flight is a musical with book by John Weidman, music by David Shire and lyrics by Richard Maltby, Jr. The musical is inspired by the early history of aviation, interweaving the lives of the Wright Brothers, Charles Lindbergh, Amelia Earhart and her publisher George Putnam, along with such sundry luminaries as Otto Lilienthal, the German "Glider King"; Commander Richard Byrd; French flying aces Nungesser and Coli, and various others.

== Productions ==
The musical premiered at London's Menier Chocolate Factory in July 2007, directed by Sam Buntrock.

Prior to the London premiere, private readings were held in October 2004, after a workshop. Maltby directed, with a cast that featured Kelli O'Hara as Amelia Earhart and Christian Borle as Wilbur Wright. The show was also initially presented as a concert at the Adelaide Cabaret Festival in 2004.

It received its American premiere at the McCarter Theatre in Princeton, New Jersey, in April 2010 running through June 6. The production was also directed by Sam Buntrock. The cast featured Jenn Colella (Amelia Earhart), Michael Cumpsty (George Putnam), Claybourne Elder (Charles Lindbergh) and Benjamin Schrader (Orville Wright).

A new version of the musical premiered at the Perèz Art Museum Miami (PAMM) on April 4th 2024 in partnership with the University of Miami’s BFA Musical Theatre program, in Miami, Florida. The cast included Madison Wenig (Amelia Earhart), Michael Stafford (George Putnam), Davis Parks (Wilbur Wright), Griffin Welti (Orville Wright), Owen Trawick (Charles Lindbergh), Will Sobel (Otto Lilienthal), Kate Bevilacqua (Amy Phipps), Eve Cohen (Anne Morrow), along with Oliver Whitehouse, Ainsley Nelson, Ava Chrusciel, Keenan Lyons, Diego Rodriguez, Nate Bergman, and Ainsley Gilbert, playing various characters in the ensemble.

== Musical numbers ==
Act I

- "Take Flight" - Orville, Wilbur, Lindbergh, Amelia, Noonan and Company
- "Equilibrium" - Orville, Wilbur
- "Sky!" - Lindbergh, Company
- "Like You, Say" - Putnam, Amelia
- "Throw It to the Wind" - Amelia, Putnam
- "Pffft!" - Lilienthal, Company
- "Lady in the Aeroplane" - Amelia, Putnam, Burke, Company
- "Lady Lindy" - Reporters, Putnam, Amelia
- "Solo/Sorry, Mr Lindbergh" - Lindbergh, Bankers, Hall
- "Earthbound" - Putnam, Amelia
- "What Are We Doing Here?" - Wilbur, Orville, Lilienthal
- "Before the Dawn" - Wilbur, Orville, Lindbergh, Amelia, Putnam, Company

Act II

- "A Part of Me" - Amelia
- "Back of the Line/Before the Dawn" (Reprise) - Lindbergh, Company
- "The Funniest Thing" - Orville, Wilbur
- "The Farther You Go) Around the World/Papua" - Putnam, Amelia, Noonan
- "The Prize/The Landing" - Company
- "Finale" - Company

== Original London cast (in alphabetical order) ==
- George Putnam - Ian Bartholomew
- Otto Lilienthal - Clive Carter
- Noonan, Byrd, others - Christopher Colley
- Ray Page, others - Ian Conningham
- Hall, others - John Conroy
- Follies Amelia, others - Helen French
- Burke, others - Edward Gower
- Amy Phipps, others - Kaisa Hammarlund
- Charles Lindbergh - Michael Jibson
- Wilbur Wright - Sam Kenyon
- Orville Wright - Elliot Levey
- Mrs. Lindbergh, others - Liza Pulman
- Amelia Earhart - Sally Ann Triplett

== Cast Recording ==
The Original Cast Recording of the London production was released by PS Classics in 2008 (ASIN: B000XUOLLQ). One Song, Pffft!, was made available only by digital download.

== Critical response ==
The CurtainUp reviewer of the Menier Chocolate Factory production wrote: "In dramatic terms, the Wright Brothers are the comedians of the musical. As inventors they form a slightly barmy double act in their felt hats and tweed suits. Amelia gives us the love interest with her devoted husband George Putnam (Ian Bartholomew) torn between letting her achieve her ambition and knowing that with the risks she takes, he may lose her. Charles Lindbergh is this curiosity, a solo pilot and seemingly a loner which, in Michael Jibson's remarkable soulful portrayal, gives the audience a sense of the isolation of those long solo flights...The performances are flawless and the singing is superb... It is rather engaging to have a musical which has a theme one can engage with intellectually. I think given some investment, Take Flight could continue its journey elsewhere, but it is still a work in progress."

The reviewer in The Guardian of the Menier Chocolate Factory production wrote: "Sam Buntrock's production may be no frills, but there is nothing cut-price about David Shire and Richard Maltby's musical paean to the romance of flight... this is a grown-up musical experience... The problems stem from a book that doesn't tie the three stories together until the end."

In his review for The New York Times of the McCarter production, Charles Isherwood wrote :"...while you can admire the craft and care taken to forge a rare theme-driven musical along the lines of groundbreaking works like “Assassins” (one of Mr. Weidman's collaborations with Stephen Sondheim), the resulting show remains amiable but superficial and stubbornly unexciting, too much like a singing children's history book."

Steven Suskin reviewed the London Cast recording: "The score, as represented on the CD, works; I found myself hanging onto every word, in fact.... Shire contributes an effective eight-piece orchestration as well, under the direction of Caroline Humphris... If the future of 'Take Flight' is unclear, the work of Shire and Maltby is most welcome. There are some vestiges of Sondheim here."

== Awards and nominations ==
=== Theatregoers' Choice Awards 2007/8 ===
- Best New Musical - nominee
- Best Supporting Actor in a Musical - Michael Jibson — nominee
