= Ipswich serial murders =

Series of murders in England during 2006

Steve Wright
- Steve Wright was convicted of five murders on 22 February 2008
- Born: Steven Gerald James Wright; 24 April 1958 (age 68); Erpingham, Norfolk, England
- Other name: The Suffolk Strangler
- Conviction: Five counts of murder
- Penalty: Life imprisonment (whole life order)

Details
- Victims: 5
- Span of crimes: 31 October – 11 December 2006
- Country: England
- Date apprehended: 19 December 2006

The Ipswich serial murders, commonly known as the work of the Suffolk Strangler, took place between 30 October and 10 December 2006, during which time the bodies of five murdered sex workers were discovered at different locations near Ipswich, Suffolk, England. Their bodies were discovered naked but there were no signs of sexual assault. Two of the victims, Anneli Alderton and Paula Clennell, were confirmed by post mortem to have been killed by asphyxiation. A cause of death for the other victims, Gemma Adams, Tania Nicol and Annette Nicholls, was not established.

Suffolk Constabulary linked the killings and launched a murder investigation codenamed Operation Sumac. Due to the size of the investigation police officers were drafted from several other police forces. Two arrests were made in connection with the murders. The first suspect, who was never officially named by police, was released without charge. Forklift truck driver Steve Wright, age 48, was arrested on suspicion of murder on 19 December 2006 and charged with the murders of all five women on 21 December.

Wright was remanded in custody and his trial began on 14 January 2008 at Ipswich Crown Court. He pleaded not guilty to the charges, although he admitted having sex with all five victims and that he had been paying for sex workers' services since the 1980s. DNA and fibre evidence were presented to the court that linked Wright to the victims. He was found guilty of all five murders on 21 February 2008, and was sentenced the following day to life imprisonment, with a recommendation that he should never be released from prison.

The murders received a large amount of media attention, both nationally and internationally. The press often compared the murders to those committed by Peter Sutcliffe, who murdered thirteen women and attacked seven others (mostly sex workers) in West Yorkshire and Greater Manchester between 1975 and 1980. There was some concern that the level of media coverage at the time could jeopardise a fair trial. The murders also sparked debates in the media over the laws surrounding prostitution.

== Police investigation ==
The locations of the bodies when found, all at various locations around Ipswich.

On 2 December 2006, the body of a young woman was discovered in the water of Belstead Brook at Thorpe's Hill, near Hintlesham, Suffolk, by a member of the public who was working as a Water Bailiff. The body, later identified as 25-year-old Gemma Adams, had not been sexually assaulted. Six days later, on 8 December, the body of 19-year-old Tania Nicol, a friend of Adams who had been missing since 30 October, was discovered in water at Copdock Mill just outside Ipswich. On 10 December, a third victim, found by a member of the public in an area of woodland by the A14 road near Nacton, was later identified as 24-year-old Anneli Alderton. According to a police statement, she had been asphyxiated and was about three months pregnant when she died.

In a press conference, investigators from the Suffolk Constabulary warned all women to stay away from the red light district of Ipswich. On 12 December, police announced that the bodies of two more women had been found. On 14 December, the police confirmed one of the bodies as 24-year-old Paula Clennell. Clennell had disappeared on 10 December and was last seen in Ipswich. According to Suffolk Police, she died from "compression of the throat". On 15 December, the police confirmed that the other body was that of 29-year-old Annette Nicholls, who disappeared on 5 December. The bodies of Clennell and Nicholls were found in Nacton near the Levington turn-off of the A1156, close to where Alderton was found. A member of the public had seen Clennell's body twenty feet (six metres) from the main road and a police helicopter dispatched to the scene discovered Nicholls' body nearby.

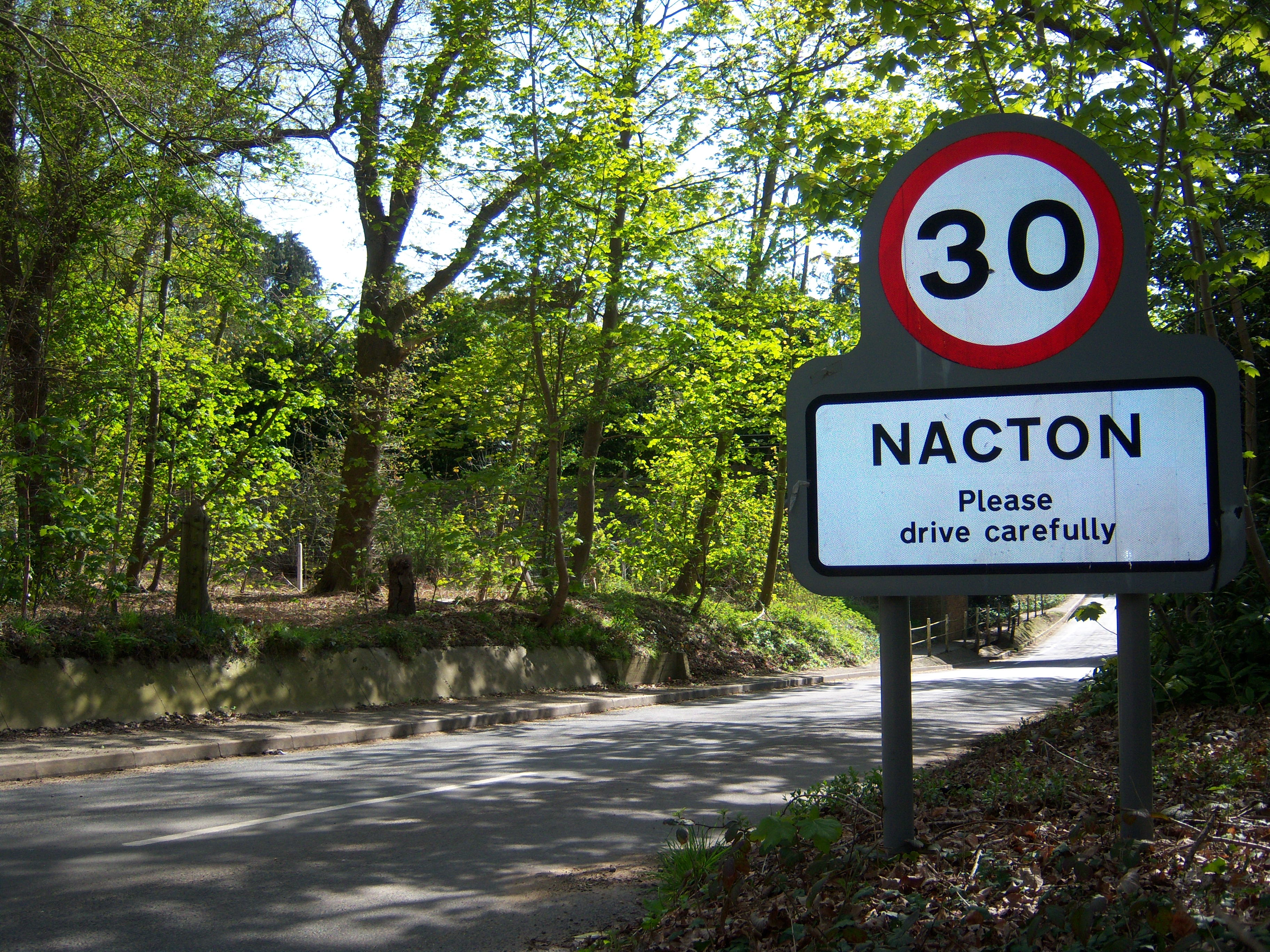
Nacton village, near where the body of Anneli Alderton was found

Suffolk Constabulary linked the killings and launched a murder investigation, codenamed Operation Sumac. Chief Constable Alastair McWhirter acknowledged that his police force would be reliant on external assistance owing to the magnitude of the investigation.

During press conferences on 13 and 14 December, Detective Chief Superintendent Gull revealed that police believed the locations where the five bodies were found to have been 'deposition sites', not murder scenes, indicating that the victims were all killed elsewhere and transported to the locations where they were later found; no comment was made on where the women may have been murdered. DCS Gull also revealed that some items of women's clothing and accessories, including a handbag and jacket, had been recovered and were being forensically tested to establish whether they belonged to any of the murdered women. During the course of the press briefings, DCS Gull stated that over 300 police officers were involved in the investigation, and some 400–450 calls were being received daily by detectives.

On 15 December, Suffolk Constabulary's website revealed that a total of 7,300 telephone calls had been made to police regarding the investigation, and that over 300 police staff and specialists were working on the cases, with support from at least 25 other police forces. As of 18 December, the number of officers involved in the investigation had increased to 650 including 350 officers from forty other police forces who had assisted in the inquiry. The number of calls received regarding the case had also increased to around 10,000.

== Victims ==
=== Tania Nicol ===
Tania Nicol, aged 19, from Ipswich, disappeared on 30 October. Her body was discovered by police divers on 8 December in a river near Copdock Mill; there was no evidence of sexual assault and a post mortem could not establish a definite cause of death.

Nicol attended Chantry High School but had left home at 16 to live in a hostel, engaging in sex work to fund her addiction to heroin and cocaine. She had originally worked in massage parlours, but was asked to leave on suspicion that she was using drugs. Her mother was unaware she was a sex worker, and thought she had been working in a bar or a hairdresser's.

=== Gemma Adams ===
Gemma Rose Adams, aged 25, born in Kesgrave, was last seen on West End Road in Ipswich, where she had been living; she disappeared on 14 November at about 01:15 (UTC). Her body was found on 2 December, in a river at Hintlesham. The first victim found, she was naked but had not been sexually assaulted.

Adams had been a popular child from a middle-class family. As a teenager, she became addicted to heroin. She had been working as a sex worker to finance her drug addiction, which had already led to loss of her job with an insurance firm. Her partner was at the time also a heroin user, and knew she was a sex worker, although her family did not.

=== Anneli Alderton ===
Anneli Sarah Alderton, aged 24, a mother of one and also in the early stages of pregnancy, had been living in Colchester, Essex. Alderton disappeared on 3 December and was last seen on the 17:53 train from Harwich to Manningtree. Alderton got off the train at Manningtree at 18:15 before going on to Ipswich on another train, arriving at 18:43. Alderton's body was found on 10 December near Nacton, in woodland in front of Amberfield School.

Alderton had been asphyxiated and was found naked, and was posed in the cruciform position. Her pregnancy was also revealed by the autopsy and her family were first informed of it by police officers.

Alderton moved to Cyprus with her mother in 1992 after her parents separated, and they returned to Ipswich in 1997. She attended Copleston High School and gained good grades in her exams. Alderton had been addicted to drugs since age 16, shortly after her father's death from lung cancer in 1998.

=== Annette Nicholls ===
Annette Nicholls, aged 29, a mother of one from Ipswich, was initially thought to have gone missing on 4 December, but at the trial it was revealed she was last seen in Ipswich town centre on 8 December. Her family reported her missing after they grew concerned at the news of the other murders. Nicholls' body was found on 12 December near Levington, naked but not sexually assaulted, and also posed in the cruciform position; a definite cause of death could not be established, but her breathing had been hampered.

Nicholls, the oldest victim, had been a drug addict since the early 2000s, shortly after completing a beautician's course at Suffolk College. Soon afterwards, she had started carrying out sex work to fund her addiction. After moving to a housing association home from her council house, Nicholls asked her mother to look after her son. She was thought to be staying with a man in Ipswich at the time of her death.

=== Paula Clennell ===
Paula Lucille Clennell, aged 24, born in Northumberland and living in Ipswich, disappeared on 10 December in Ipswich at approximately 00:20. Clennell's body was found on 12 December near Levington on the same day as Nicholls'. Clennell was found naked, but not sexually assaulted and a post mortem reported that she had been killed by a compression of her throat. Prior to her death, Clennell commented on the then recent murders in an interview with Anglia News, stating that despite them making her "a bit wary about getting into cars" she continued to work because "I need the money."

Clennell moved to East Anglia ten years before her death, following the breakup of her parents' marriage. Clennell had three children with her partner; all had been taken into care and adopted due to her drug addiction. Clennell herself had spent some of her childhood in a referral unit, and it was shortly after being placed there that she started taking drugs.

=== Victoria Hall ===
On 22 May 2024, Steve Wright was charged with the murder and kidnap of 17-year-old Victoria Hall in 1999. Hall was last seen alive in the early hours of 19 September 1999, in High Road, Trimley St Mary, Suffolk. Her body was found in a ditch near a field, about 25 miles (40 km) from where she was last seen.

On 26 February 2025 he appeared via video link from HMP Long Lartin at the Old Bailey for a hearing in the Victoria Hall case. On 2 February 2026, Wright pleaded guilty to the charges.

== Arrests of suspects ==
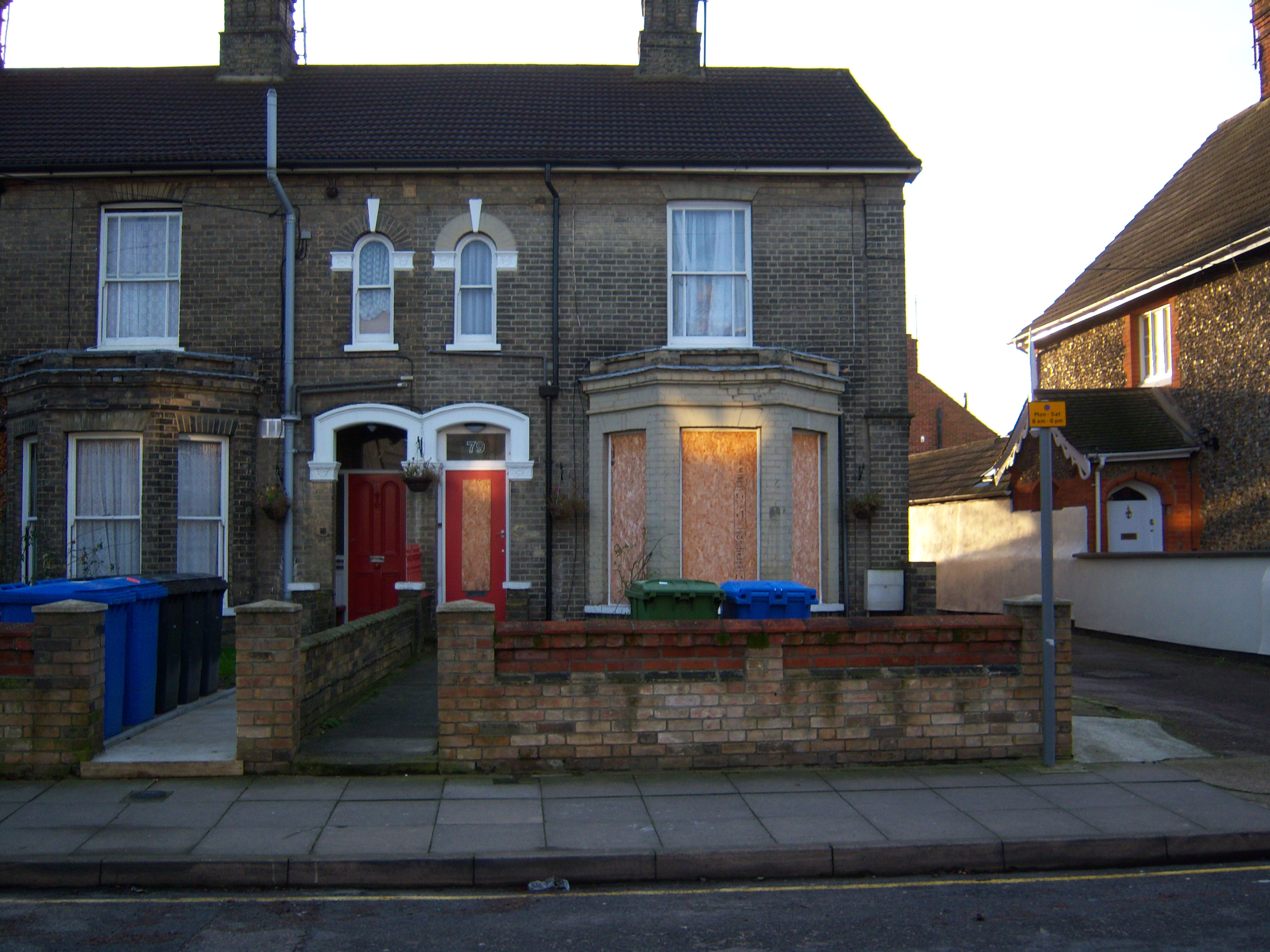
Wright's rented flat, 79 London Road, Ipswich, which was boarded up from his arrest until February 2009

On 18 December 2006, Suffolk Constabulary reported that they had arrested a 37-year-old man on suspicion of murdering all five women. The man was arrested at 07:20 at a house in Trimley St. Martin near Felixstowe, Suffolk. The detention of the suspect was extended by magistrates by a further period of 24 hours, to the maximum of 96 hours allowed under English law.

At 05:00 on 19 December, police arrested a second suspect, a 48-year-old, at a residence in Ipswich, on suspicion of committing murder. The following day, 20 December, police were granted a 36-hour extension to question the second suspect in detention.

On 21 December, a joint statement was issued by DCS Gull and Michael Crimp, senior prosecutor for the Crown Prosecution Service in Suffolk, announcing that the second suspect identified as Steve Wright had been charged with the murder of all five women.

Police said that the first suspect, who was not officially named, was released on police bail. Bail conditions were cancelled on 6 June 2007 for the first suspect, as no more inquiries concerning the case were planned involving this person.

== Court appearances ==
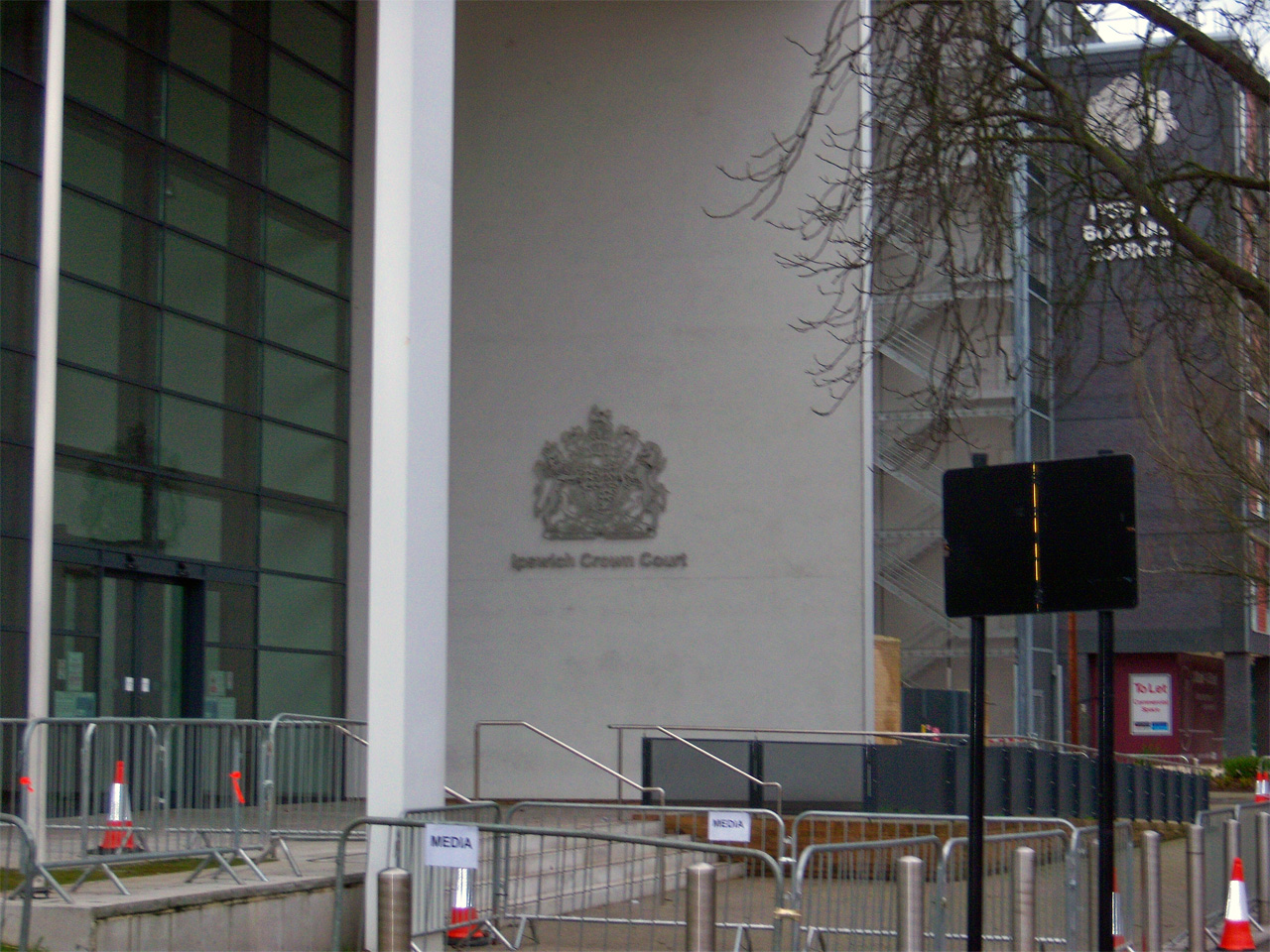
Ipswich Crown Court, with the 'media pen' specially erected for the court case. Sky News also constructed a shelter on the roof of a nearby building.

Wright appeared before magistrates in Ipswich on 22 December 2006, and was remanded in custody. His trial began 16 January 2008. A second jury (of nine men and three women) was selected after a member of the first jury could not continue to serve because of ill health.

The court heard how the bodies of Anneli Alderton and Annette Nicholls were deliberately posed in the cruciform position, with DNA evidence linking Steve Wright to three of the victims and fibre evidence also connecting him to the victims.

The defence argued that Wright frequented sex workers and had "full sex" with all of the victims except Tania Nicol, whom he picked up with the intention of having sex, but apparently changed his mind and returned her to Ipswich's red light district. This contradicted Wright's earlier statement when stopped by police in the district in the early hours of the morning: he implied he was unaware he was in the red light district and was driving around because he could not sleep. Wright's rented flat was located in the red light area.

Jurors were taken to sites involved in the case, including the exterior of Wright's rented house and the sites where the victims were found.

The prosecutor suggested that Wright may not have acted alone, as the remains of Anneli Alderton were found some distance from the road but with no evidence that her body had been dragged by one person.

In his summing up, the judge urged the jury to put aside their emotions:

The loss of these five young lives is clearly a tragedy. You are likely to have sympathy for the deceased and their families. Your sympathy ... must not sway you ... You may view with some distaste the lifestyles of those involved ... whatever the drugs they took, whatever the work they did, no-one is entitled to do these women any harm, let alone kill them.

=== Verdict ===
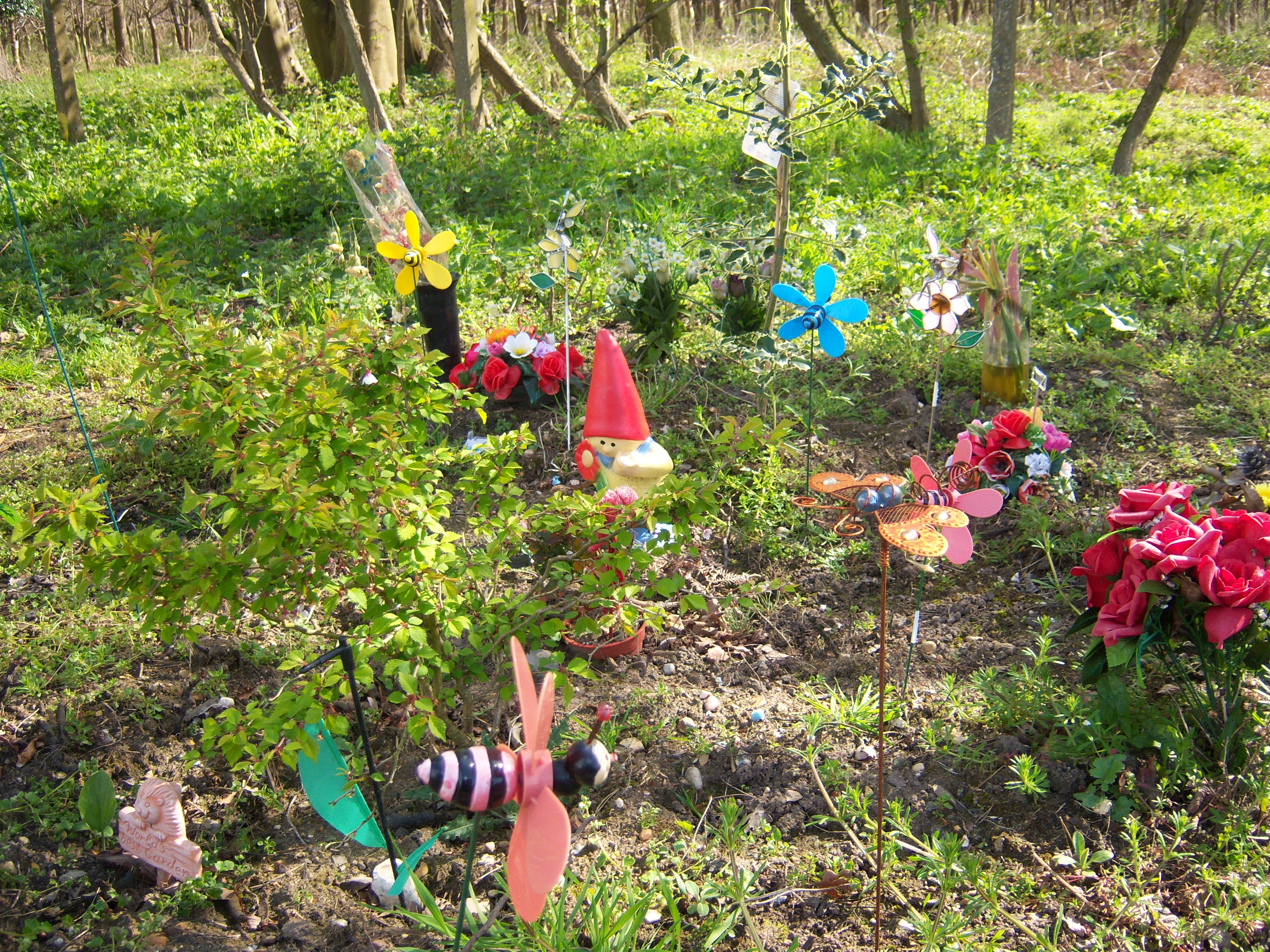
Memorial site close to where the bodies of Paula Clennell and Annette Nichols were found

On 21 February, after eight hours of deliberation, the jury returned unanimous verdicts against Wright on all five counts of murder. A murder conviction carries an automatic term of life imprisonment but the judge could decide if Wright was eligible for parole. The prosecution argued that Wright should receive a whole life tariff and thus never be released from prison. On 22 February Wright was sentenced to life imprisonment, the judge recommending against parole because the murders involved a "substantial degree of pre-meditation and planning".

Some family members felt that Wright deserved the death penalty. Craig Bradshaw, brother-in-law of Paula Clennell, said: "These crimes deserve the ultimate punishment and that can only mean one thing. Where a daughter and the other victims were given no human rights by the monster, his will be guarded by the establishment at great cost to the taxpayers of this country and emotionally to the bereaved families." But the father of Gemma Adams said, "I am very relieved and pleased for all of the families that this is now over and we can now start to get on with our lives."

Prime minister Gordon Brown said the case was an example of the importance of the national DNA database.

== Steve Wright biography ==
Steve Gerald James Wright was born in the Norfolk village of Erpingham in April 1958. Wright joined the Merchant Navy after leaving school. In 1978, he married and had a son soon afterwards; the couple later divorced. In 1987 he married another woman; they separated in 1988, and also divorced.

He worked as a dock worker, a steward on the QE2, a lorry driver, a barman, and, just prior to his arrest, a fork-lift truck driver. He became a father again with another lover in 1992. Wright built up large debts largely through gambling, and had recently been declared bankrupt. Wright had twice tried to commit suicide, firstly by carbon monoxide poisoning and then, in 2000, by an overdose of pills.

Wright met his last girlfriend, Pamela Wright (the shared surname is a coincidence), in 2001 in Felixstowe, and they moved to the house in Ipswich together in 2004. Wright had always admitted that he had paid for sex, firstly whilst in the Merchant Navy, and continuously throughout his life. Investigations into other crimes Wright might have committed continue, including the possibility of an involvement in the Suzy Lamplugh disappearance. However Metropolitan Police have stated that this is not a strong line of enquiry.

== Media coverage ==
CCTV image of Alderton on the train was released by the police and heavily used by the media

The murders have been likened to those by Peter Sutcliffe, the "Yorkshire Ripper" who was convicted of murdering 13 women (and wounding seven others), many of whom were involved in sex work, over a period of five years from 1975 to 1980 in northern England; and to "Jack the Ripper", the infamous Victorian serial murderer who was also thought to target sex workers.

As with previous serial killers dating back to Jack the Ripper, many sections of the media have attempted to coin a name for the presumed murderer, using the "Suffolk Strangler" and other terms to refer to the case.

A reward was offered, first by local business Call Connection, who initially offered £25,000 and later raised it to £50,000.

=== Concerns about the media coverage ===
On 21 December 2006, the Attorney General Lord Goldsmith issued guidance to the media after concerns were raised by Suffolk Constabulary about the coverage and potential prejudice of a future trial. Lord Goldsmith urged the media to show restraint in what they reported about the two suspects being held, for fear of prejudicing any possible trial. A senior prosecutor on the case, Michael Crimp, also expressed his concerns about potentially prejudicial media coverage: "Steven Wright stands accused of these offences and has a right to a fair trial before a jury. It is extremely important that there should be responsible media reporting which should not prejudice the due process of law."

=== Coverage of related issues ===
The murders refocused press attention on a number of controversial issues in British politics.

The first is that of prostitution in the United Kingdom. The murders have highlighted the vulnerability of sex workers and the lack of action taken by the government, whether to be more punitive in the hope of reducing the numbers of sex workers on the streets, to move towards legalised brothels and other measures to improve the safety of the women, or to target the demand for sex workers through prosecution of the clients, as is done in Sweden. The government has moved in the direction of tough "anti-prostitution" laws which target the clients.

The government had at one point considered allowing "mini brothels", but abandoned this plan after fears that such establishments would bring pimps and drug dealers into residential areas. Instead, the laws became tougher: the Policing and Crime Act 2009 made it illegal to pay for sex with a prostitute who has been "subjected to force" and this is a strict liability offense (clients can be prosecuted even if it was not known the prostitute was forced).

The second is that of drug use and whether it should be legalised or decriminalised, provided on prescription to registered addicts, or penalised more harshly. High numbers (95% according to the Home Office) of street prostitutes in the United Kingdom have a history of substance abuse, and prostitution is one means of funding addiction, known to have been used by all five of the victims.

== Appeals ==
In March 2008, it was announced that Wright would be lodging an appeal against both his convictions and the trial judge's recommendation of a whole life tariff, claiming (amongst other things) that the trial should not have been held in Ipswich and that the evidence against him constituted insufficient proof of guilt. He was reported to have written to the court of appeal "All five women were stripped naked of clothing/jewellery/phones/bags and no evidence was found in my house or car." He has asked for a new solicitor. This first appeal was rejected in July 2008.

In July 2008, it was announced that a new appeal would be lodged, but in February 2009 it was reported that Wright had dropped this appeal, though some of his family hoped to persuade the Criminal Cases Review Commission to review the case.

== Dramatisations ==
The BBC Drama department commissioned a dramatisation of the murders and the investigation from screenwriter Stephen Butchard. The three-part production, entitled Five Daughters, began filming in November 2009, and was broadcast on BBC One from 25 to 27 April 2010. Only a few days after the BBC's announcement of the drama, Brian Clennell, the father of Paula Clennell, complained that it would portray the victims in "a bad light". Wright's brother David also complained that it would jeopardise any future retrial. Sarah Lancashire and Ian Hart led the cast.

A musical play, London Road, commissioned by the Royal National Theatre and written by Alecky Blythe and Adam Cork, is based on interviews with residents of the street in Ipswich where Steve Wright lived. A film adaptation of the play was released in the United Kingdom in 2015.

The case was also featured in an episode of the TV documentary series Real Crime.

== See also ==
- List of serial killers by country
- List of serial killers by number of victims
- David Smith – another British killer of sex workers
- Lorraine Thorpe – murdered two people in Ipswich in 2009
