= Paul Thornley =

Paul Thornley may refer to:

- Paul Thornley (snooker player)
- Paul Thornley (actor)
