= British Independent Film Awards 2012 =

Annual British film awards ceremony

The 15th British Independent Film Awards, held on 9 December 2012 at the Old Billingsgate Market in central London, honoured the best British independent films of 2012.

== Awards ==
=== Best Director ===
- Peter Strickland - Berberian Sound Studio
- Bart Layton - The Imposter
- Ben Wheatley - Sightseers
- John Madden - The Best Exotic Marigold Hotel
- Rufus Norris - Broken

=== The Douglas Hickox Award ===
Given to a British director on their debut feature.

- Bart Layton - The Imposter
- Ben Drew - Ill Manors
- Rowan Athale - Wasteland
- Rufus Norris - Broken
- Sally El Hosaini - My Brother the Devil

=== Best Screenplay ===
- Amy Jump, Alice Lowe and Steve Oram - Sightseers
- Mark O'Rowe - Broken
- Paul Andrew Williams - Song for Marion
- Peter Strickland - Berberian Sound Studio
- Abi Morgan - The Iron Lady

=== Best Actress ===
- Andrea Riseborough - Shadow Dancer
- Alice Lowe - Sightseers
- Elle Fanning - Ginger and Rosa
- Judi Dench - The Best Exotic Marigold Hotel
- Meryl Streep - The Iron Lady

=== Best Supporting Actress ===
- Olivia Colman - Hyde Park on Hudson
- Vanessa Redgrave - Song for Marion
- Maggie Smith - The Best Exotic Marigold Hotel
- Eileen Davies - Sightseers
- Alice Englert - Ginger and Rosa

=== Best Actor ===
- Toby Jones - Berberian Sound Studio
- Tim Roth - Broken
- Terence Stamp - Song for Marion
- Steve Oram - Sightseers
- Riz Ahmed - Ill Manors

=== Best Supporting Actor ===
- Rory Kinnear - Broken
- Billy Connolly - Quartet
- Cillian Murphy - Broken
- Domhnall Gleeson - Shadow Dancer
- Tom Wilkinson - The Best Exotic Marigold Hotel

=== Most Promising Newcomer ===
- James Floyd - My Brother the Devil
- Elliott Tittensor - Spike Island
- Eloise Laurence - Broken
- Paul Brannigan - The Angels' Share
- Zawe Ashton - Dreams of a Life

=== Best Technical Achievement ===
- Joakim Sundström - Sound Design - Berberian Sound Studio
- Nic Knowland - Cinematographer - Berberian Sound Studio
- Electric Wave Bureau - Music - Broken
- Robbie Ryan - Cinematographer - Ginger and Rosa
- Andrew Hulme - Editor - The Imposter

=== Best Documentary ===
- The Imposter
- London: The Modern Babylon
- Roman Polanski: A Film Memoir
- Marley
- Dreams of a Life

=== Best Achievement in Production ===
- Berberian Sound Studio
- Sightseers
- The Sweeney
- Ill Manors
- The Imposter

=== Best Short Film ===
- Volume
- Friday
- Junk
- Swimmer
- Skyborn

=== The Raindance Award ===
- Strings
- Love Tomorrow
- Frank
- Jason Becker: Not Dead Yet
- City Slacker

=== Best Foreign Independent Film ===
- The Hunt
- Amour
- Searching for Sugarman
- Rust and Bone
- Beasts of the Southern Wild

=== Best British Independent Film ===
- Broken
- Sightseers
- The Best Exotic Marigold Hotel
- The Imposter
- Berberian Sound Studio

=== The Richard Harris Award ===
- Michael Gambon

=== The Variety Award ===
- Jude Law

=== The Special Jury Prize ===
- Sandra Hebron
