= Chantry High School =

Chantry High School is the name of several educational institutions.

== United Kingdom ==
- Chantry Academy, Chantry, Ipswich, Suffolk
- The Chantry School, Martley, Worcestershire
