= James Doherty (actor) =

English actor (born 1966)

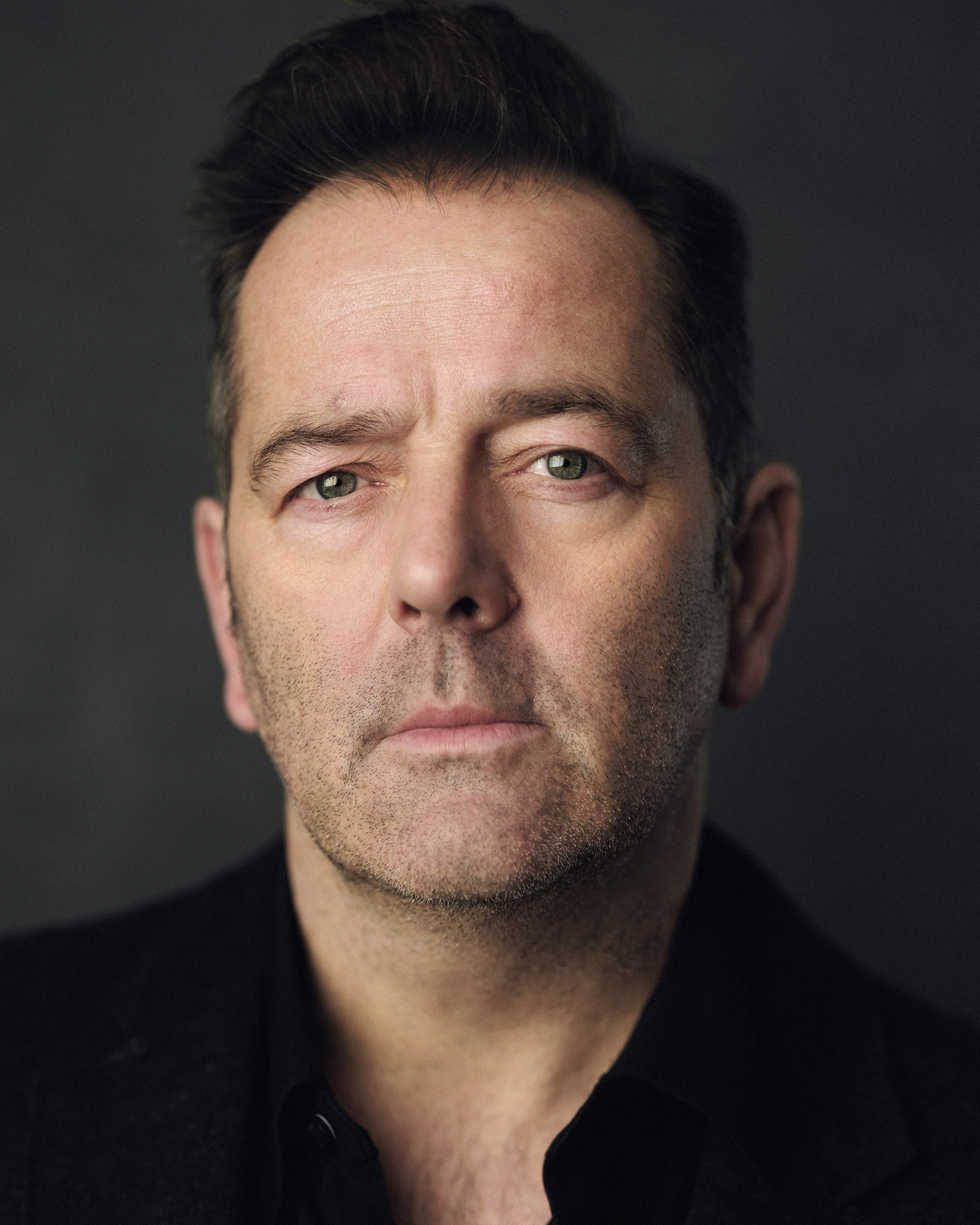
- Born: 17 December 1966 (age 59); Guildford, Surrey, England
- Occupation: Actor
- Years active: 1990–present
- Spouse: Joanna Sinnott
- Children: 2

James Doherty (born 17 December 1966) is an English actor.

== Life and career ==
Born in Guildford, Surrey, he was educated at Felsted School in Essex and was a member of the National Youth Theatre of Great Britain. He trained at the Guildford School of Acting, graduating in 1989. He is married to TV presenter Joanna Sinnott and together they have two children, Jago (2006) & Nell (2013).

Doherty is best known for his appearances in TV comedy including roles in The Thick Of It, Veep, Rev, Miranda, The Windsors, and the BAFTA winning Him & Her - The Wedding. His work in feature films includes roles in Backbeat, Verity's Summer, Inbred, Deviation, London Road and the Oscar-nominated In the Loop.

He has also appeared in West End musicals including roles in, Les Misérables, The Buddy Holly Story, A Slice of Saturday Night and Marguerite. Doherty played the role of Amos Hart in the West End production of Chicago at the Cambridge Theatre in 2011 opposite Christie Brinkley. He later reprised this role when the show transferred to the Garrick Theatre playing opposite America Ferrera.

Doherty has appeared in London Road, 50 Years on Stage and Beyond Caring at the National Theatre. In January 2020, Doherty began playing the role of Claude in the multi award-winning Come From Away at the Phoenix Theatre in London.

== Credits ==
=== Film ===
Year	Title	Role
1994	Backbeat	Tony Sheridan
2007	The Man Who Would Be Queen	Hugo
2007	Too Much Too Young	James Coldwell
2008	David and David (short)	Will/Craig/David
2009	City Rats	Trevor
2009	In the Loop	TV Reporter
2012	Verity’s Summer	Jim
2012	Inbred	Jeff
2012	Deviation	Jono
2012	Anonymous (short)	Tom
2012	The Forgotten	Martin
2012	Closed Circuit	Foreman
2014	The Batsman and the Ballerina	Brian
2015	London Road	Seb
2016	A Midsummer Nights Dream	Snout
2017	Kat & The Band	Ted Bonwell

=== Television ===
Year	Title	Role	Network
1991	2 Point 4 Children	Pete	BBC
1992	In Sickness and In Health	Mr Rice	BBC
1995	Operavox/Carmen	Don Jose	BBC
1996	The Jack Dee Show	Gail Tuesday's Grant	Channel 4
1998	The Bill	Solicitor	ITV
1999	Dad Xmas Special	PC Atkinson	BBC
1999	Hippies - BBC	Film Director	BBC
1999	Small Potatoes	Giles	Channel 4
1999	Agony	Various Roles	BBC
2000	Hotel Getaway (2001-2003)	Hotel Manager	ITV
2000	Bob Martin	Tony	ITV
2000	The Wyvern Mystery	Mick	BBC (TV film)
2000	The Bill	PC. Coles	ITV
2001	The Slightly Filthy Show	Various	LWT
2001	Night and Day	Vincent Ellis	ITV
2001-2002	EastEnders	Randle	BBC
2002	The Jury	David Hinde	ITV
2002	Footballer's Wives	Larry Gold Shed	ITV
2002	Peak Practice	Alan Reeves	ITV
2002-2003	Is Harry On The Boat?	Brian Simms (Regular)	Sky One
2003	The Royal	Philip Sutton	ITV
2003	Holby City	Gareth Alty	BBC
2004	The Bill	Ray Allenby	ITV
2004	Doctors	Jimmy Marshall	BBC
2005	All About George	Orderly	ITV
2005	The Thick Of It	Steve	BBC
2005	According to Bex	James	BBC
2006	Doctors	Andy Shaw	BBC
2006	Casualty	Bill Forrest	BBC
2007	Genie in the House	Mr Fender	Nickelodeon
2007	Katy Brand's Big Ass Show	Various (Series Regular)	ITV
2008	EastEnders	Saul	BBC
2008-2009	Londoners	Alvin Fox (Series Regular)	TVP1 Poland
2010	Rev	Rod Sellix	BBC
2010	The Increasingly Poor Decisions of Todd Margaret	MP	Channel 4
2010	Doctors	DS Doug Ray	BBC
2010	Miranda (2010-2013)	Policeman	BBC
2010-2011	Mongrels	Dale	BBC
2012	The Royal Bodyguard	Palace Footman	BBC
2012	A Touch of Cloth	Pete Pretzel	Sky One
2012	Naked House	Gavin	ITV
2012-2013	Watson and Oliver	Various Characters	BBC
2013	PhoneShop	Copper	Channel 4
2013	Count Arthur Strong	City Gent	BBC
2013	Coronation Street	Andy Wolfe	ITV
2013	Waterloo Road	Martin Johnson	BBC
2013	The IT Crowd	Anonymous' Dad	Channel 4
2013	Ambassadors	Kevin	BBC miniseries
2013	Him & Her	Dennis	BBC
2014	Veep	Reporter	HBO
2014	Endeavour	Mr Lee	ITV
2014	Boomers	Patrick	BBC
2014	Give Out Girls	Geezer	Sky One
2015	Cradle to Grave	Norman	BBC
2015	The Job Lot	Mr Coleman	ITV
2015	Top Coppers	Television Producer	BBC
2016	The Increasingly Poor Decisions of Todd Margaret	Jeremy Stephenson	Channel 4
2016	Suspicion	Detective Harry Fisk	October Films
2016	Coronation Street	Phil	ITV
2017	Doctors	Tony Albright	BBC
2017	Delicious	Greg - Recovery Man	Sky One
2017-2018	The Windsors	Henry VIII/Ted the Landlord	Channel 4
2018	Clique	Rob	BBC
2018	Flaps	Various Characters	Comedy Central
2019	Coronation Street	Scott Heritage	ITV
2019	Queens of Mystery	Kenneth Ridley	Acorn TV USA
2019	Call the Midwife	Charlie Wilson	BBC
2019	Motherland	PC Hughes	BBC
2020	Outlander	Charles Turnbull	Starz
2020	Us	Quizmaster	BBC
2020	The Sister	Brian Weatherall	ITV
2021	Sliced	Dave	Dave
2021	Avenue 5	Various	HBO
2021	Close to Me	Jim	Channel 4
2021	Too Close	Blair	ITV
2021	This England	Tom	Sky Atlantic
2022	Trying	Terry	Apple TV
2022	Endeavour IX	Mr Lee	ITV
2023	FBI: International	Special Agent Albert Judd	CBS
2023	Big Boys	Russell	Channel 4
2023	The Couple Next Door	Lawrie	Starz/Channel 4
2023	Sexy Beast	Jared Harrison	Paramount+
2024–2026	House of the Dragon	Cley (4 episodes)	HBO

=== Theatre ===
Year	Title	Notes	Role
1991	A Slice of Saturday Night	Arts Theatre	Gary
1992	The Rocky Horror Show	UK Tour	Brad/Eddie
1994	The Buddy Holly Story	UK and Toronto	Norman Petty
1997	Saucy Jack	Queens Theatre	Jack
1997	Joey'n Gina's Wedding	Cafe Royal	Frankie Night
1998	Separate Tables	Kings Head Theatre	Jack
1998	Harlequinade	Kings Head Theatre	Charles
1998	Les Misérables	Palace Theatre	Grantaire
2001	Gangster No 1	Kings Head Theatre	Title Role
2005	House and Garden	Harrogate Theatre	Giles Mace
2006	Teechers	Haymarket Theatre	Mr Nixon
2007	Teenage Kicks	Assembly Rooms, Edinburgh Festival	John Walters
2008	Marguerite	Theatre Royal Haymarket	Saurel
2009	Super Alice Smith	Trafalgar Studios	Joe King/ Ken Bright
2011	Chicago	Cambridge Theatre	Amos Hart
2012	Chicago	Garrick Theatre	Amos Hart
2012	London Road	National Theatre	Terry
2012	God of Carnage	Northampton Theatre Royal	Michael
2013	NT: 50 Years on Stage	National Theatre/BBC	Various
2014	Kiss Me, Kate	Royal Albert Hall/BBC Proms	First Man/Gunman
2015	Eventide	Arcola Theatre	John
2016	Beyond Caring	National Theatre/UK Tour	Phil
2016	Aladdin	Lyric Hammersmith	Widow Twankey
2018	Fatherland	Lyric Hammersmith/Frantic Assembly	Steve
2019	In Lipstick	Pleasance Theatre	Dennis
2020	Come From Away	Phoenix Theatre	Claude

=== Video games ===
Year	Title	Role
2020	Call of Duty: Black Ops	Various
2021	Last Stop	John Smith
2022	Elden Ring	Hewg/Abandoned merchant/Frenzied merchants
2022	Xenoblade Chronicles 3	Past Moebius W
2023	Xenoblade Chronicles 3: Future Redeemed	Past Moebius W
