= The Rise (film) =

2012 British crime film

- Film poster
- Directed by: Rowan Athale
- Starring: Luke Treadaway; Iwan Rheon; Timothy Spall; Matthew Lewis
- Release date: 7 September 2012 (Toronto International Film Festival)
- Running time: 106 minutes
- Language: English

The Rise (titled Wasteland in North America) is a 2012 British crime film starring Luke Treadaway and Timothy Spall with a revenge theme.

== Plot ==
The film opens with DI West (Spall) interviewing Harvey Miller (Treadaway) who had been framed by a gangster called Roper. In flashback we are shown how Harvey, 6 weeks earlier, had been released from prison where he had used information heard in prison to plan his revenge on Roper.

Harvey tells how he has planned and executed his revenge using his friends. He reveals details of the failed revenge, a robbery, to West. West reminds Miller of a football match during which a player of a similar description to Miller's, was "let down by his team".

There is insufficient evidence to charge Harvey. West leaves the room, the interview tape recording having been stopped. When he returns and Harvey has left, he finds that Harvey has recorded on the tape the actual details of the robbery during which he successfully took his revenge on Roper. Harvey is relying on West to let him succeed by ignoring the recording and letting him leave the country with his friends.

== Production ==
The Rise was filmed in and around Leeds.

There were many contributors to the production of the film. The opening credits state:

- Bankside Films (A Head Gear Films Company)
- Lipsync Productions
- MoliFilms
- MoliFilms presents
- In participation with Head Gear Films and Metrol Technology
- In association with LipSync Productions, Woodleigh Pictures, Bankside Films, Limelight CTL and Hook Pictures
- A Mischief Films and Moll-Mischief Production

About his part as Dodd, Matthew Lewis, in his interview by the Yorkshire Evening Post said; "The character of Dodd was really fun for me to play. He is the biggest of all of his mates and very loyal. He’s on the front line but isn’t the sharpest knife in the drawer."

== Cast ==
- Luke Treadaway as Harvey Miller
- Iwan Rheon as Dempsey
- Gerard Kearns as Charlie
- Matthew Lewis as Dodd
- Neil Maskell as Roper
- Vanessa Kirby as Nicola
- Timothy Spall as DI West
- Paul Clayton as Albert
- Lewis Rainer as PC Nixon
- Brad Moore as Sgt Kendon
- Gary Cargill as Liverpudlian inmate
- Malcolm Rider as Stan

== Reception ==
Allan Hunter, writing for Express.co.uk described the film as "a smart little British thriller" with a "lousy title".

Simon Crook, in empireonline.com wrote that "there’s a fresh Angry Young Man feel to this botched-heist thriller" and "It may not be immune to the odd Brit thriller cliché, but this is an assured, stylish heist thriller from the debut filmmaker."

According to Ben Sachs, in Chicago Reader; "This British heist picture is familiar but energetic genre filmmaking, more interesting in its particulars than in its overall conception".

== Critical reviews ==
As of June 2020, the film holds a 60% approval rating on Rotten Tomatoes, based on 25 reviews with an average score of 5.39/10.
