= Macbeth (2010 film) =

British TV film by Rupert Goold

- DVD cover
- Written by: William Shakespeare (original play)
- Directed by: Rupert Goold
- Starring: Patrick Stewart; Kate Fleetwood
- Country of origin: United Kingdom
- Original language: English

Production
- Executive producers: Mark Bell; David Horn
- Producers: Sebastian Grant; John Wyver
- Cinematography: Sam McCurdy
- Editor: Trevor Waite
- Running time: 160 minutes
- Production company: Illuminations Television Ltd.

Original release
- Network: BBC Four
- Release: 12 December 2010

Macbeth is a 2010 television film based on William Shakespeare's tragedy of the same name. It was broadcast on BBC Four on 12 December 2010. In the United States, it aired on PBS' Great Performances. It was directed by Rupert Goold from his stage adaptation for the Chichester Festival Theatre in 2007. Patrick Stewart is featured in the title role, with Kate Fleetwood as Lady Macbeth.

== Premise ==
The film is a more modern re-imagining of William Shakespeare's Macbeth. It evokes the atmosphere of Romania in the 1960s, with parallels between Ceaușescu and Macbeth in their equally brutal quests for power. The Three Witches likewise receive an update in keeping with the 20th century aesthetics, appearing as hospital nurses. Their presence is pervasive throughout the film, punctuating the horror of Macbeth's murderous reign.

== Cast ==
Principal cast:

- Macbeth – Patrick Stewart
- Lady Macbeth – Kate Fleetwood
- Banquo – Martin Turner
- Macduff – Michael Feast
- Malcolm – Scott Handy
- Donalbain – Ben Carpenter
- Duncan / Doctor – Paul Shelley
- Lady Macduff – Suzanne Burden
- Lennox – Mark Rawlings
- Ross – Tim Treloar
- Angus – Bill Nash
- Old Seyward / Murderer – Christopher Knott
- The Porter – Christopher Patrick Nolan
- Fleance – Bertie Gilbert

== Production ==
The film was shot entirely on location at Welbeck Abbey.

== Awards ==
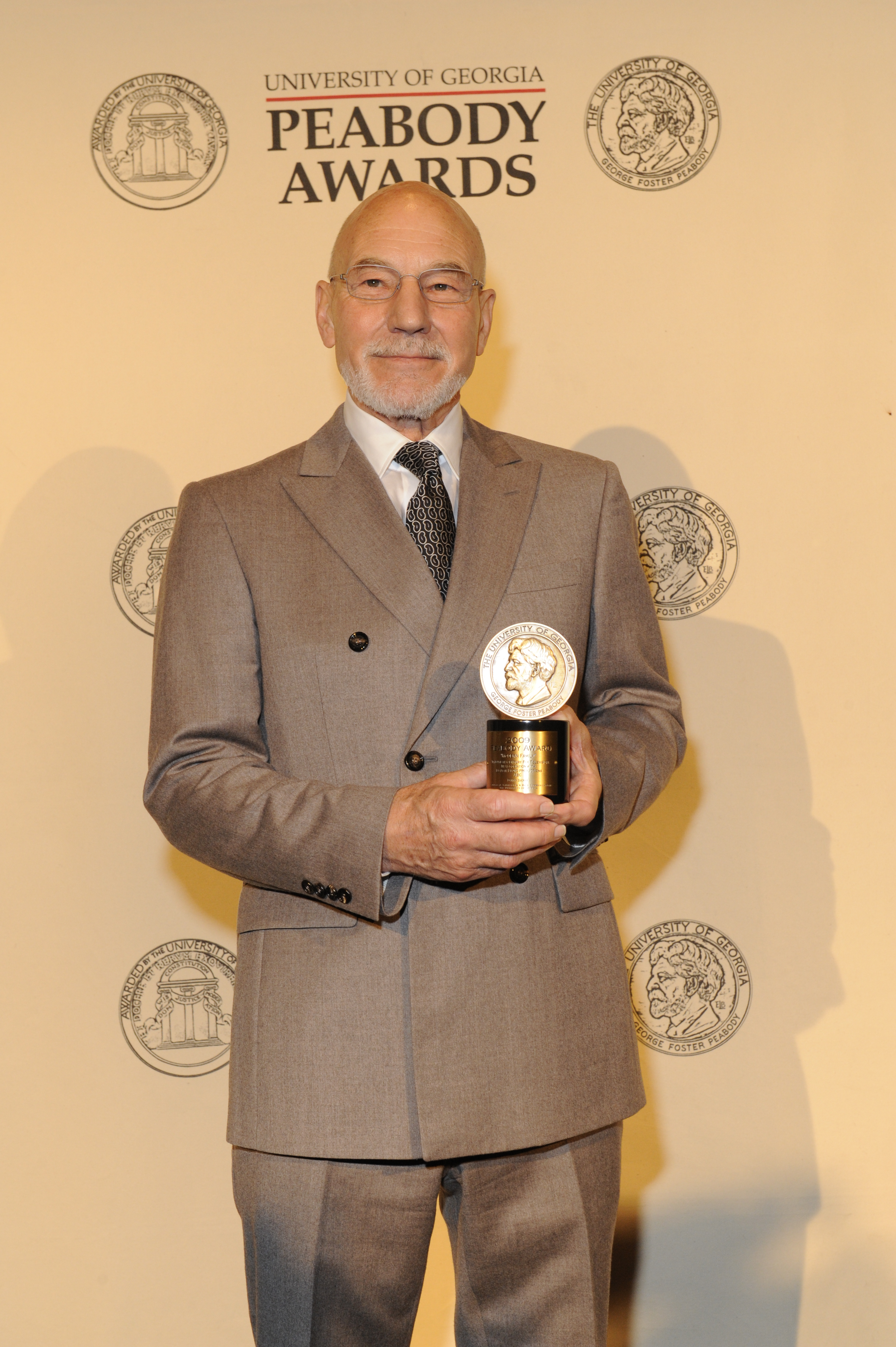
Patrick Stewart at the 71st Annual Peabody Awards

Macbeth won a Peabody Award in 2010. In addition, Patrick Stewart was nominated for a Screen Actors Guild Award for Outstanding Performance by a Male Actor in a Television Movie or Miniseries.
