= Rowan Athale =

British film director and screenwriter

Rowan Athale is a British film director and screenwriter. He made his feature directorial debut with the British crime thriller Wasteland, released in the United Kingdom as The Rise, and later directed the thriller Strange but True. His screenwriting credits include Revolt, Outside the Wire, The Vault, and episodes of Gangs of London. In 2025 he wrote and directed the biographical sports drama Giant, about the relationship between boxer Naseem Hamed and trainer Brendan Ingle. Athale was named a Screen International Star of Tomorrow in 2011 and a BAFTA Breakthrough Brit in 2013.

== Career ==
Athale's early work included commercials, producing short films, and the short film A Good Life. His first feature as writer-director was Wasteland, a British crime thriller starring Luke Treadaway, Iwan Rheon, Timothy Spall, Matthew Lewis and Vanessa Kirby. The film premiered at the 2012 Toronto International Film Festival in the Discovery programme. It was nominated for the Douglas Hickox Award for best debut director at the 2012 British Independent Film Awards.

In 2013, BAFTA named Athale among the first cohort of Breakthrough Brits as a writer-director.

Athale co-wrote the 2017 science-fiction feature Revolt with Joe Miale. The project had previously been developed under the title Prisoner of War.

Athale directed the 2019 thriller Strange but True, adapted from the novel by John Searles and starring Margaret Qualley, Amy Ryan, Greg Kinnear, Nick Robinson, Blythe Danner and Brian Cox.

His later screenwriting work includes the Netflix science-fiction action film Outside the Wire, written with Rob Yescombe, and the heist thriller The Vault, directed by Jaume Balaguero. In 2022, he wrote two episodes of the second series of Gangs of London. He also wrote A Gangs of London Story: Ghosts, a graphic novel created with Corin Hardy and illustrator Ferenc Nothof to bridge the gap between the first and second series of the show.

In 2017, Universal Pictures won a bidding war for Athale's spec script Little America, with Athale also attached to direct. In 2020, Deadline Hollywood reported that Sylvester Stallone was attached to star in the project, with AGC Studios launching international sales at the European Film Market.

Athale wrote and directed Giant, a biographical sports drama about Naseem Hamed and Brendan Ingle, starring Amir El-Masry and Pierce Brosnan. The film had its world premiere at the 2025 BFI London Film Festival. Reuters reported that Giant began its global theatrical rollout in January 2026.

In 2021, BBC Studios Drama Productions and EbonyLife Media announced development of Reclaim, a six-part action-adventure series written by Athale.

== Filmography ==
Year	Title	Role	Notes
2005	Project Huxley	Producer	Short film
2006	In a Day	Producer	Feature film
2010	A Good Life	Writer-director	Short film
2012	Wasteland / The Rise	Writer-director	Feature film
2017	Revolt	Co-writer	Feature film; previously developed as Prisoner of War
2019	Strange but True	Director	Feature film
2021	Outside the Wire	Screenwriter	Feature film; screenplay with Rob Yescombe
2021	The Vault / Way Down	Screenwriter	Feature film
2022	Gangs of London	Writer	Television series; two episodes
2022	A Gangs of London Story: Ghosts	Writer	Graphic novel
2025	Giant	Writer-director	Feature film

== Awards and recognition ==
Year	Body	Category	Work	Result
2011	Screen International	Stars of Tomorrow	N/A	Won
2012	British Independent Film Awards	The Douglas Hickox Award	Wasteland	Nominated
2013	BAFTA	Breakthrough Brits	N/A	Won
