= Rufus Norris =

British theatre and film director (born 1965)

Sir Rufus Norris
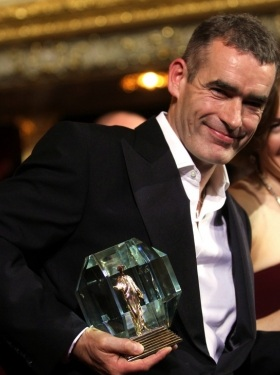
- Norris in 2012
- Born: 16 January 1965 (age 61); Cambridge, England
- Education: RADA
- Occupation: Theatre director
- Spouse: Tanya Ronder (m. 1995)

Sir Rufus John Norris (born 16 January 1965) is a British theatre and film director, who was the artistic director and chief executive of the National Theatre from 2015 to 2025. He received the Society of London Theatre Special Award in 2025 for his services to theatre. He trained as an actor at RADA before turning to directing, and won the Evening Standard Award for Outstanding Newcomer in 2001 for his production of Afore Night Come.

== Personal life ==
Norris grew up in Africa and Malaysia, attended North Bromsgrove High School and Kidderminster College of Further Education, and later trained as an actor at RADA before turning to directing.

Norris has been in a relationship with playwright Tanya Ronder since the 1980s. After Norris' retirement from the National Theatre, the couple moved from London to Fife.

== Career ==
In 2001 he won the Evening Standard Award for Outstanding Newcomer for his production of David Rudkin's Afore Night Come at the Young Vic.

In 2004, Norris won another Evening Standard Award, a Critic's Circle Award and an Olivier Award nomination for Best Director, for his production of Festen.

In 2006 he made his National Theatre debut directing Market Boy by David Eldridge. From 2002 to 2007 Norris was an Associate Director at the Young Vic, where his productions have included Feast by Yunior Garcia Aguilera, Rotimi Babatunde, Marcos Barbosa, Tanya Barfield and Gbolahan Obisesan (2013), Vernon God Little by DBC Pierre (2007), adapted by Tanya Ronder (2009 and 2011), Hergé's Adventures of Tintin, which Norris adapted, with David Greig (Barbican, 2005; UK tour & West End, 2007) and his own adaptation of Sleeping Beauty (Young Vic, 2002; Barbican, 2004, UK & international tour).

His production of the Kander and Ebb musical Cabaret, produced by Bill Kenwright, ran at the Lyric Theatre in London's West End from 2006 to 2008. The production toured in 2008 and 2009 before being revived at the Savoy Theatre in 2012, followed by another UK tour. Another UK tour began in 2017.

In 2009, Norris's first film King Bastard, written by his wife Tanya Ronder, was produced by BBC Films. In the same year, he directed the National Theatre's production of Wole Soyinka's Death and the King's Horseman, which played in the Olivier Theatre.

He created the 2011 production Dr Dee for the Manchester International Festival, in collaboration with musician Damon Albarn, which was subsequently performed at ENO in 2012. In 2010 he directed Mozart's Don Giovanni, also for ENO.

Norris was made an associate director at the National Theatre in 2011. His production of London Road by Alecky Blythe and Adam Cork opened at the Cottesloe in 2011, before transferring to the Olivier in 2012, winning the Critics' Circle Award for Best Musical.

His 2012 film Broken premiered at the Cannes Film Festival and received the Golden Eye Award for best international film at the Zurich Film Festival. At the 2012 British Independent Film Awards it won the award for Best British Independent Film.

In 2013 his production of Tanya Ronder's play Table launched the new space, The Shed, at the National Theatre. He subsequently directed James Baldwin's The Amen Corner at the National Theatre.

=== Director of the National Theatre ===
In March 2015, Norris replaced Nicholas Hytner as artistic director of the National Theatre. During his first season, he directed the medieval play Everyman in a new adaptation by Carol Ann Duffy starring Chiwetel Ejiofor in the title role and for the Christmas season, the premiere of a new musical, Wonder. Land (following a run in summer of 2015 at the Manchester International Festival and before a run at the Théâtre du Châtelet in summer of 2016) with music by Damon Albarn and lyrics and book by Moira Buffini, inspired by Lewis Carroll's novels Alice's Adventures in Wonderland and Through the Looking-Glass.

In summer 2016 he directed Bertolt Brecht and Kurt Weill's The Threepenny Opera, in a new adaptation by Simon Stephens and starring Rory Kinnear as Macheath. In spring 2017 he directed My Country; a work in progress by Carol Ann Duffy, using the words of people across the UK regarding Brexit, which was followed by a UK tour. In the Dorfman Auditorium in July 2017 he directed a new play Mosquitoes by Lucy Kirkwood, starring Olivia Colman and Olivia Williams. In 2018 he directed his first Shakespeare play in 25 years, Macbeth, with a cast including Rory Kinnear as Macbeth and Anne-Marie Duff as Lady Macbeth.

In 2019, Norris directed Helen Edmundson's adaptation of Andrea Levy's book Small Island in the Olivier Theatre at the National Theatre. The critically acclaimed production was broadcast to cinemas worldwide by National Theatre Live. Following its initial sold-out run, Small Island was scheduled to return to the Olivier Theatre in late 2020, but the Covid-19 pandemic delayed its return until spring 2022. Small Island was also shown as part of the free National Theatre at Home steaming programme during the UK 2020 Covid-19 lockdown.

Hex opened in December 2021 but the production was curtailed in January 2022 due to a resurgence of Covid-19. It was restaged at the end of 2022 and ran into January 2023. The critical reaction was favourable,

In June 2023, Norris announced that he would be stepping down from his position in spring 2025. In March 2025, Norris was awarded the Society of London Theatre Special Award.

=== Honorary degree ===
In November 2023, Norris received the honorary degree, Doctor of Letters (DLitt), from the University of St Andrews.

== Views ==
On 16 August 2018, he condemned the destruction of the Said al-Mishal Cultural Centre in Gaza, which was destroyed by Israeli airstrikes on 11 August 2018.

== Work ==
=== Theatre productions ===
Plays directed by Rufus Norris
Play	Playwright	Theatre	Opening date	Notes
Death of a Salesman	Arthur Miller	Zorlu PSM, Istanbul, Turkey	6 June 2026	
Hex	Tanya Ronder, Jim Fortune and Rufus Norris	Olivier Theatre, National Theatre	6 December 2022	
Small Island	Helen Edmundson	Olivier Theatre, National Theatre	1 May 2019	Broadcast as part of National Theatre Live and streamed as part of National Theatre at Home
Macbeth	William Shakespeare	Olivier Theatre, National Theatre & UK Tour	26 February 2018	
Mosquitoes	Lucy Kirkwood	Dorfman Theatre, National Theatre	18 July 2017	
My Country: a work in progress	Carol Ann Duffy	Dorfman Theatre, National Theatre & UK Tour	28 February 2017	
The Threepenny Opera	Bertolt Brecht & Kurt Weill, translated and revised by Simon Stephens	Olivier Theatre, National Theatre	25 May 2016	Broadcast as part of National Theatre Live
wonder.land	Moira Buffini & Damon Albarn	Manchester International Festival & Olivier Theatre, National Theatre	23 November 2015	
Everyman	Carol Ann Duffy	Olivier Theatre, National Theatre	22 April 2015	Broadcast as part of National Theatre Live
Behind the Beautiful Forevers	David Hare, based on the book by Katherine Boo	Olivier Theatre, National Theatre	10 November 2014	Broadcast as part of National Theatre Live
The Amen Corner	James Baldwin	Olivier Theatre, National Theatre	11 June 2013	
Table	Tanya Ronder	The Shed, National Theatre	9 April 2013	
Cabaret	John Kander, Fred Ebb & Joe Masteroff	Savoy Theatre	3 October 2012	
London Road	Alecky Blythe & Adam Cork	Cottesloe and Olivier Theatre, National Theatre	7 April 2011 & 12 August 2012	Won Critics' Circle Award for Best Musical. Nominated for four Olivier Awards in 2012, including Best Director and Best New Musical.
Doctor Dee	Damon Albarn	Palace Theatre, Manchester	30 June 2011	
Vernon God Little	Tanya Ronder	Young Vic	27 January 2011	
Don Giovanni	Wolfgang Amadeus Mozart	English National Opera	6 November 2010	
The Country Girl	Clifford Odets	Theatre Royal, Windsor	21 July 2010	
Death and the King's Horseman	Wole Soyinka	Olivier Theatre, National Theatre	1 April 2009	
Les Liaisons Dangereuses	Christopher Hampton	Selwyn Theatre, Broadway	1 May 2008	Nominated for the Tony Award for Best Revival of a Play in 2008.
Cabaret	John Kander, Fred Ebb & Joe Masteroff	Lyric Theatre & UK Tour	22 September 2006	
Market Boy	David Eldridge	Olivier Theatre, National Theatre	27 May 2006	
Festen	David Eldridge	Music Box Theatre, Broadway	23 March 2006	
Festen	David Eldridge	Almeida Theatre	29 March 2004	Won both the Evening Standard and Critics Circle Best Director Awards. Nominated for five Olivier Awards in 2005.
Nye	Tim Price	Royal National Theatre, Wales Millennium Centre	24 February 2024	Broadcast as part of National Theatre Live and streamed as part of National Theatre at Home

=== Filmography ===
- 2009 King Bastard
- 2012 Broken
- 2015 London Road

== See also ==
- List of English speaking theatre directors in the 20th and 21st centuries
