= Clare Burt =

English actress and singer

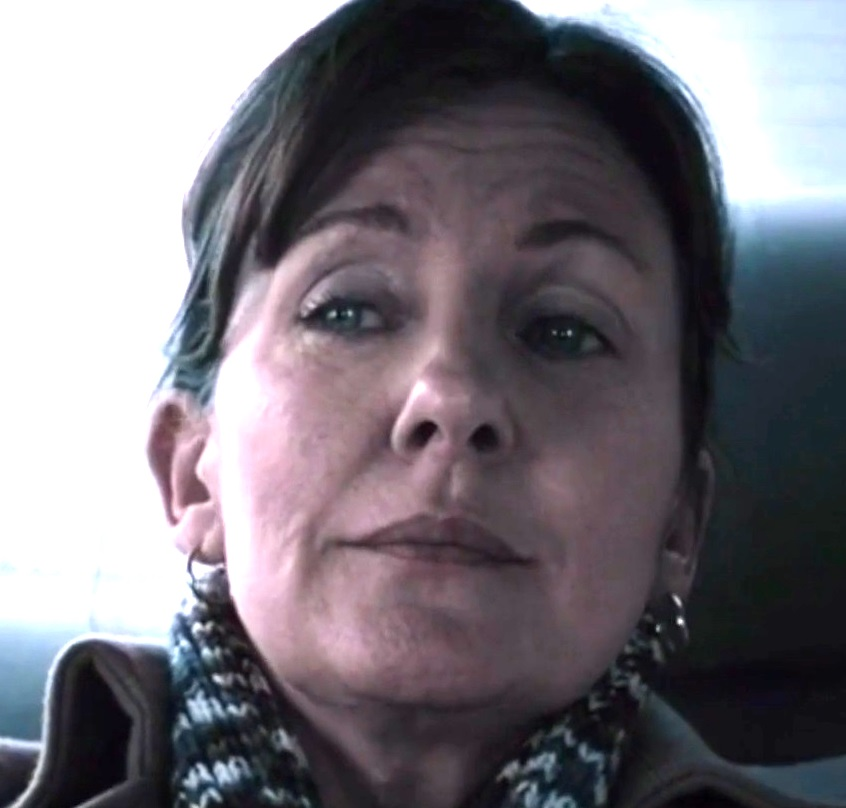
- Burt in London Road 2015
- Born: England
- Occupations: Actress, singer
- Years active: 1983–present
- Partner: Larry Lamb (1996–2016)
- Children: 2

Clare Burt is an English actress and singer. Her theatre work includes Coram Boy (2006), Cats, Aspects of Love, Sunday in the Park with George, Closer Than Ever, Cat on a Hot Tin Roof, Big Fish, and Pal Joey.

Her screen credits include The Bill (1989–2005), Doctors (2003), Murder Investigation Team (2005), The Christmas Miracle of Jonathan Toomey (2007), Criminal Justice (2008), Broken (2012), X+Y (2014), London Road (2015), Top Boy, (2013–2022), Holby City (2004–2022), and The Salisbury Poisonings (2020).

== Early life ==
As a child she attended the Sylvia Young Theatre School.

== Career ==
=== Theatre ===
Burt is a member of the National Theatre company, and has played in many productions, including: London Road (musical), The Miracle, and as Mrs. Milcote in the 2006 production of Helen Edmundson's Coram Boy. Her other productions include: Vernon God Little, Closer Than Ever, Company, Nine, Spread a Little Happiness, Cat on a Hot Tin Roof, and Pal Joey.

Her West End roles include Grizabella in Cats (New London Theatre), Rose Vibert in Aspects of Love (Prince of Wales Theatre), Celeste #2 in Sunday in the Park with George (Royal National Theatre), Susan in Company (Noël Coward Theatre), Fosca in Passion (Bridewell) and two new musicals by Howard Goodall: The Hired Man (London Astoria) and Girlfriends (Playhouse Theatre).

Burt played the Witch in the 1998 Donmar Warehouse revival of Into the Woods. She played Sandra opposite Kelsey Grammer in the musical Big Fish for its London premiere in late 2017. Burt starred as theatre director Joan Littlewood in a new musical Miss Littlewood for the Royal Shakespeare Company in summer 2018.

=== Film and television ===
Her screen credits include The Christmas Miracle of Jonathan Toomey (2007), Broken (2012), X+Y (2014), opposite Asa Butterfield, and Sally Hawkins, and London Road (2015), Her television credits include Top Boy, (2013–2022), Criminal Justice (2008), Doctors (2003), Murder Investigation Team (2005), The Bill (1989–2005), Holby City (2004–2022).

In 2020, she played Mo Cassidy in the BBC drama, The Salisbury Poisonings, alongside Anne-Marie Duff, Rafe Spall, MyAnna Buring and Mark Addy.

== Personal life ==
Burt was in a relationship with Larry Lamb from 1996 until 2016. They have two daughters, Eloise and Eva.

== Filmography ==
Burt's filmography includes:

- Holby City (television series, 2004, 2021–2022)
- The Bill (television series, 1989–2005)
- The Christmas Miracle of Jonathan Toomey (film, 2007)
- Criminal Justice (television mini-series, 2008)
- Broken (2012)
- X+Y (2014)
- London Road (2015)
- The Salisbury Poisonings (2020)
- The Diplomat (2024)
