= Michael Shaeffer =

British actor

- Born: 21 January 1975 (age 51); Brockley, London, England
- Education: Rose Bruford College
- Occupation: Actor
- Years active: 2000–present
- Television: Black Mirror; Bodyguard; The ABC Murders; The Salisbury Poisonings

Michael Shaeffer is an English television and stage actor. He is especially known for his role as "Longcross" in the BBC political-thriller television series Bodyguard (2018).

He has also appeared in the television series Black Mirror (2013), The ABC Murders (2018) and The Salisbury Poisonings (2020), as well as the 2000 film adaptation of Jesus Christ Superstar.

He has also played smaller roles in television shows, including Game of Thrones and Chernobyl, and films such as Kingdom of Heaven and Rogue One.

On stage, he is known for portraying the titular characters of Mr. Burns in Mr. Burns, a Post-Electric Play, and Aerys II "The Mad King" Targaryen in Game of Thrones: The Mad King.

== Early life and education ==
Michael Shaeffer was born in Brockley, London, England. He trained at the Rose Bruford College of Speech and Drama.

== Career ==
Shaeffer played Annas in the 2000 Great Performances film adaptation of Jesus Christ Superstar.

In 2013, he appeared in the Black Mirror episode "The Waldo Moment" as the character Roy.

Shaeffer portrayed General Corssin in the 2016 Star Wars film Rogue One.

In 2018 Shaeffer played MI5 agent Richard Longcross in the BBC political-thriller television series Bodyguard. In the same year, he played Sergeant Yelland in the BBC mystery thriller The ABC Murders.

In 2019, Shaeffer played a small role in the critically acclaimed HBO historical drama Chernobyl, where he portrayed a KGB officer. In 2020, he played Stephen Kemp in the BBC fact-based drama The Salisbury Poisonings.

In Summer 2023, Shaeffer was cast as Edward Daffarn in Grenfell, author and playwright Gillian Slovo's verbatim theatre project with the community and survivors about the Grenfell fire disaster, staged at the National Theatre's Dorfman Theatre.

== Filmography ==
Year	Title	Role	Notes
2000	Great Performances	Annas	In Jesus Christ Superstar
2002	The Sandwich	Nick	Short Film
2005	Kingdom of Heaven	Young Sergeant	
2009	M.I. High	Butch	Episode: Dark Star
2011	Silent Witness	Jason Bodle	Episode: A Guilty Mind: Part 1 & 2
2012	Broken	Desk Sergeant	
2012	Game of Thrones	Stark Soldier	Episode: Valar Morghulis
2012	Anna Karenina	Doorkeeper	
2012	Mrs Biggs	Police Inspector	Episode: #1.1
2012	Parade's End	RSM	Episode: #1.2
2013	Black Mirror	Roy	Episode: The Waldo Moment
2013	Trance	Security Guard #1	
2013	Luther	Gordon Murray	Episode: #3.3
2015	Foyle's War	Jack Davey	Episode: Trespass
2015	The Vote	Gerry Henderson	TV movie
2015	London Road	Simon Newton	
2015	New Tricks	DCI Martin Ackroyd	Episode: Last Man Standing
2015	The Girl in the Dress	Vicar	
2015	Fire	Ranger (Mark)	
2016	Grantchester	Eric Whitaker	Episode: #2.3
2016	Rogue One	General Corssin	
2017	Taboo	Doctor Powell	Episode: #1.1
2017	SS-GB	David	Episode: #1.5
2017	Vera	Ian Holland	Episode: Broken Promise
2017	Rellik	Steven Mills	
2018	Bodyguard	Longcross	
2018	The ABC Murders	Sergeant Yelland	
2019	Chernobyl	Blond Man	
2020	The Salisbury Poisonings	Stephen Kemp	
2020	The Liberator	Pop Bullock	TV miniseries
2022	SAS: Rogue Heroes	Neil Ritchie	
2023	Bodies	Commissioner Hayden Harker	TV limited series
2024	Kraven the Hunter	Andre	

== Theatre ==
Year	Title	Role	Writer	Director	Venue
2014	The Beautiful Game	Thomas	Andrew Lloyd Webber and Ben Elton	Robert Carsen	Cambridge Theatre, London
2014	Mr. Burns, a Post-Electric Play	Sam, Mr. Burns	Anne Washburn	Robert Icke	Almeida Theatre, London
2014	Little Revolution	Tony	Alecky Blythe	Joe Hill-Gibbins	Almeida Theatre, London
2015	How to Hold Your Breath	Jarron	Zinnie Harris	Vicky Featherstone	Royal Court Theatre, London
2017	Girl From The North Country	Reverend Marlowe	Conor McPherson	Lucy Hind	The Old Vic, London
2017	All About My Mother	Lola	Pedro Almodovar	Samuel Adamson	The Old Vic, London
2019	A Very Expensive Poison	Andrei Lugovoi/Dr Gent/Gorbachev	Lucy Prebble	John Crowley	The Old Vic, London
2023	Grenfell: In the Words of Survivors	Edward Daffarn	Gillian Slovo	Phyllida Lloyd and Anthony Simpson-Pike	Dorfman Theatre
2026	Game of Thrones: The Mad King	King Aerys II "The Mad King" Targaryen	Duncan Macmillian	Dominic Cooke	Royal Shakespeare Theatre, Stratford-Upon-Avon
