= Alastair McWhirter =

British retired senior police officer

Alastair McWhirter QPM
- Born: 1953 (age 72–73); Lanarkshire
- Education: Hamilton Academy; Aberdeen University; Aberdeen Teacher Training College
- Occupation: Police officer
- Years active: 1977–2007
- Known for: 2006 Suffolk serial killer investigation

Alastair McWhirter is a British retired senior police officer. Born in 1953 in Lanarkshire, he was educated at Hamilton Academy and Aberdeen University where he studied for an MA in English and History; this was followed by a Post Graduate Certificate of Education at Aberdeen Teacher Training College.

McWhirter was the chief constable of Suffolk Constabulary. He came to public prominence during the police 2006 Suffolk serial killer investigation in Ipswich in December 2006, one of the most prolific killers in recent British criminal history.

He taught English and drama in Winchester and joined Hampshire Constabulary in 1977. He served in all ranks up to chief superintendent in Hampshire working in cities and more rural areas with diverse populations and policing challenges.

McWhirter was in 1996 appointed assistant chief constable (operations) in the Wiltshire Constabulary, responsible for all operational policing. He was largely responsible for returning the policing of the summer Solstice at Stonehenge back to 'normality' after a decade of confrontation with new Age travellers and assorted Druid groups. He successfully developed the first joint Fire Police and Ambulance control room to share both a room and a computer system.

In 2000, he was appointed deputy chief constable and he was appointed chief constable of Suffolk Constabulary in 2003. McWhirter was also the national spokesperson on rural policing for the Association of Chief Police Officers - ACPO. He represented the police service during the Hunting debate from 1998 to 2006 and was disliked by both pro- and anti- hunting groups for refusing to take sides in the fraught debate.

McWhirter was awarded the Queen's Police Medal in the 2002 New Year Honours.

He left the police in 2007, after reaching 30 years service. He was replaced as Suffolk's chief constable by Simon Ash, previously the deputy chief constable of Hertfordshire Police. He was chair of Suffolk Primary Care Trust from 2007-2013.
