= Paul Thornley (actor) =

British actor

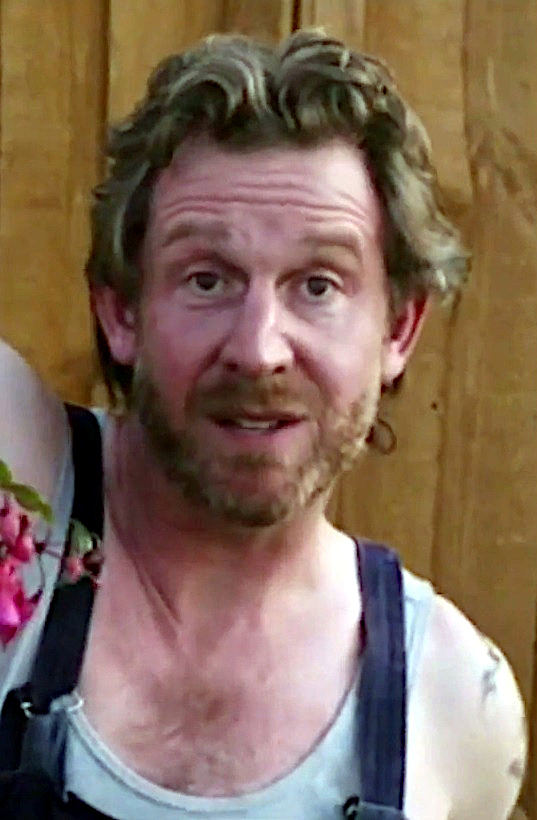
- Thornley in London Road (2015)
- Occupation: Actor
- Years active: 2003–present
- Spouse(s): Chloe Howman (m. 2013; div. 2017)

Paul Thornley is a British actor represented by Conway van Gelder Grant and Bespoke Voice Agency.

== Career ==
Thornley holds a long list of theatre credits across the UK and on Broadway. Thornley played Dodge in the original cast of the musical London Road at the National Theatre, a role which he later reprised in the film version in 2015. In 2025 he performed in the National Theatre revival of London Road, once more reprising his role of Dodge.

Prior to this, Thornley performed in the National Theatre's award-winning production of Dear England in 2023. Further credits include The Habits at Hampstead Theatre, A Chorus of Disapproval at the Harold Pinter Theatre, The Three Musketeers at the Rose Theatre, Kingston and It's a Wonderful Life at the Wolsey Theatre. In 2025, Thornley performed in the Old Vic production of Mary Page Marlowe.

In 2016 he played Ron Weasley in the original London cast of Harry Potter and the Cursed Child at the Palace Theatre in the West End. He was nominated for Best Supporting Actor in a Play at the 2017 Whatsonstage.com Awards. Thornley reprised his role as Weasley on Broadway at the Lyric Theatre in 2018 and again in 2020.

Thornley's extensive screen credits include Netflix's Hostage, Maigret, Call the Midwife, Apple TV's Criminal Record and The Crown. He can also be seen in feature film The Unlikely Pilgrimage of Harold Fry, The Mercy, and Grimsby among many others.

For video games, Thornley provided the voice for Olgierd von Everec in the Hearts of Stone expansion for The Witcher 3: Wild Hunt in 2015. In 2018 he voiced protagonist Addam Origo in Xenoblade Chronicles 2: Torna – The Golden Country.

== Stage credits ==
=== Theatre ===
Year	Title	Role	Theatre	Dir.	Ref
1995	All's Well That Ends Well	The Astringer	Regent's Park Open Air Theatre	Helena Kaut-Howson	
1995	Scrooge	Topper / Bob Cratchit	Apollo/BCC Productions	Tudor Davis	
1996	Paint Your Wagon	Mike Mooney	New Shakespeare Company	Ian Talbot	
1996	The Tempest	Francisco	Regent's Park Open Air Theatre	Patrick Garland	
1997	Kiss Me, Kate	Ralph/Hortensio	New Shakespeare Company	Ian Talbot	
1997	A Midsummer Night's Dream	Snug the Joiner	New Shakespeare Company	Rachel Kavanaugh	
1998	South Pacific	Professor	Sheffield Crucible Theatre	Deborah Paige	
1998	Up on the Roof	Scott	Colchester Mercury Theatre	Jenny Darnell	
1999	Hamlet	Guildenstern / Osric	Greenwich Theatre	Chris Geelan	
1999	Escape from Pterodactyl Island	Robert Worthington	Brave New World	Philip George	
1999	Spend Spend Spend	Matt	Pola Jones	Jeremy Sams	
2001	Noises Off	Tim Allgood / Gary Lejeune	Royal National Theatre	Jeremy Sams	
2005	Private Fears in Public Places	Dan	Stephen Joseph Theatre/59E59 Theater New York	Alan Ayckbourn	
2007	Not A Game For Boys	Tony	Manchester Library Theatre	Simon Pittman	
2008	The Miracle	Ginger	Royal National Theatre	Paul Miller	
2008	In The Red and Brown Water	O' Lee Roon / The Man From State	Young Vic	Walter Meierjohann	
2009	It's A Wonderful Life	George	Wolsey Theatre Ipswich	Peter Rowe	
2010	The Three Musketeers	Athos	Rose Theatre Kingston	Francis Matthews	
2011	London Road	Dodge	National Theatre	Rufus Norris	
2012	A Chorus of Disapproval	Ian Hubbard	Harold Pinter Theatre		
2016	Harry Potter and the Cursed Child	Ron Weasley	Lyric Theatre New York	John Tiffany	
2018	Harry Potter and the Cursed Child	Ron Weasley	Palace Theatre	John Tiffany	
2025	Mary Page Marlowe	Ray	The Old Vic	Matthew Warchus	
2025	London Road	Dodge	National Theatre	Rufus Norris	
2025	The Habits	Dennis	Hampstead Theatre	Ed Madden	
2023	Dear England	Mike Webster	National Theatre	Rupert Goold	

== Filmography ==
=== Film ===
Year	Title	Role	Ref.
2011	Holy Night!	Ox, Potter, Farmer	
2011	The Somnambulists	Man 7	
2012	Broken	Policeman 1	
2012	Metamorphosis	The Second Lodger	
2012	Les Misérables	Constable 1	
2014	Camera Trap	Nicholas	
2015	Man Up	Adam	
2015	Minions	News Reporter (voice)	
2015	London Road	Dodge	
2016	Grimsby	Clive Graves	
2017	The Mercy	Portishead Operator	
2023	The Unlikely Pilgrimage of Harold Fry	Rich the T-Shirt Pilgrim	

=== Television ===
Year	Title	Role	Notes	Ref.
2003	Alibi	P.C. Blake	Television film	
2003–2004	Midsomer Murders	Sergeant Gill	2 episodes	
2004	The Brief	Liam Walsh	Episode: "The Road to Hell"	
2004–2006	Life Begins	Jeff	15 episodes	
2005	The Bill	Gordon McGowen	2 episodes	
2006	Viva Blackpool	Buttons	Television film	
2006	Doctors	Stephen Richmond	Episode: "Last Laugh"	
2007	The Afternoon Play	Howard Harris	Episode: "Death Becomes Him"	
2007	Recovery	Estate Agent	Television film	
2008	Fairy Tales	Goran Pepic	Episode: "Rapunzel"	
2008	Ashes to Ashes	Ian Kay	Episode #1.4	
2008	Foyle's War	Edward Hylton	Episode: "All Clear"	
2008	Love Soup	Gary	Episode: "Ragged Claws"	
2008	Mutual Friends	Darren	2 episodes	
2008	The Bill	Glen Thomas	Episode: "Trial and Error: Part 2"	
2009	Murderland	Connor Mackie	2 episodes	
2010	Agatha Christie's Poirot	Inspector Raglan	Episode: "Hallowe'en Party"	
2010	Just William	Gamekeeper	Episode: "The Sweet Little Girl in White"	
2011	Silk	Alex Turley	Episode: "All Plain Sailing"	
2012	Above Suspicion	Mike Reynolds	Episode: "Silent Scream: Part 1"	
2012	Holby City	Daniel 'Daz' Piper	Episode: "Ribbons"	
2013	Doctors	Tim Mannall	Episode: "Goodbye Yellow Brick Road"	
2013	Big Bad World	Nigel	Episode #1.4	
2013	By Any Means	D.I. Matthew Dixon	Episode #1.1	
2013, 2014	Trollied	Mike	2 episodes	
2015	Holby City	Tom Blaine	Episode: "The Beat Goes On"	
2015	Doc Martin	Gerry	Episode: "Rescue Me"	
2016	Father Brown	Joseph Sinclair	Episode: "The Wrath of Baron Samdi"	
2016	The Crown	Bill Matheson	Episodes: "Gelignite" and "Gloriana"	
2018	Trauma	Matthew Holloway	Episode #1.2	
2018	Shakespeare & Hathaway: Private Investigators	Rex Olsen	Episode: "The Chameleon's Dish"	
2018	The Good Karma Hospital	Gavin	Episode #2.2	
2019	Treadstone	Leo Biller	3 episodes	
2021	Superworm	Papa Beetle / Papa Toad	Television film; voice	
2022	Agatha Raisin	D.I. Barret	Episode: "Love, Lies and Liquor"	
2022	Sister Boniface Mysteries	Clifford Winner	Episode: "Crimes and Miss Demeanours"	
2022	Silent Witness	Hugh Caulfield	Episode: "History - Part Three"	
2023	Lockwood & Co	Cutter	Episode: "Mesmerised"	
2023	Vera	Steve Wilson	Episode: "For the Grace of God"	
2023	The Gold	Max Goodman	5 episodes	
2023	The Nevers	New Superintendent	2 episodes	
2023	A Small Light	Scheublein	Episode: "Boiling Point"	
2024	Sexy Beast	Jeff Leighton	Episode: "Trouble Is Real"	
2024	Criminal Record	Stefan Ash	3 episodes	
2024	Piglets	Ch. Supt. Timothy Legland (Pimp)	Episode: "Triggers"	
2024	Tiddler	Lobster / Additional voices	Television film	
2025	Call the Midwife	Philip Cunningham	Episode #14.1	
2025	Miss Scarlet and The Duke	Bertie Campbell / Dr. Timpson	Episode: "The Deal"	

=== Video games ===
Year	Title	Voice role	Notes
2007	Battalion Wars 2	Commander Pierce	
2013	Total War: Rome II	Voice	
2015	The Witcher 3: Wild Hunt	Olgierd von Everec	English version
2016	Total War: Warhammer	Voice	
2017	Lego Marvel Super Heroes 2	Voice	
2017	Xenoblade Chronicles 2	Addam	English version
2018	Xenoblade Chronicles 2: Torna – The Golden Country	Addam	English version
2020	Solasta: Crown of the Magister	Orenetis / Sitenero	
2023	Diablo IV	Additional voices	
