= London Road (film) =

- Theatrical release poster
- Directed by: Rufus Norris
- Screenplay by: Alecky Blythe; Adam Cork
- Based on: London Road by Alecky Blythe and Adam Cork
- Produced by: Dixie Linder
- Starring: Olivia Colman; Anita Dobson; Tom Hardy
- Cinematography: Danny Cohen
- Edited by: John Wilson
- Music by: Adam Cork
- Production companies: BBC Films; Cuba Pictures; National Theatre; British Film Institute; Lipsync Productions; Arts Council England; Kreo Films; Protagonist Pictures
- Distributed by: Picturehouse Entertainment
- Release date: 12 June 2015
- Running time: 91 minutes
- Country: United Kingdom
- Language: English
- Budget: £3 million
- Box office: £216,000

London Road is a 2015 British musical mystery crime drama film directed by Rufus Norris and written by Adam Cork and Alecky Blythe based on their National Theatre musical of the same name, which in turn is based on the interviews about the Steve Wright killings. The film stars Olivia Colman, Anita Dobson and Tom Hardy.

The film was selected to be shown in the City to City section of the 2015 Toronto International Film Festival.

== Cast ==
- Olivia Colman as Julie
- Anita Dobson as June
- Tom Hardy as Mark
- Kate Fleetwood as Vicky
- Clare Burt as Jan
- Claire Moore as Councillor Carole
- Janet Henfrey as Ivy
- Paul Thornley as Dodge
- Jenny Galloway as Margaret
- Anna Hale as Jessica
- Gillian Bevan as Colette McBeth
- Michael Shaeffer as Simon Newton
- James Doherty as Seb
- Nick Holder as Ron
- Mark Sheals as Wayne
- Hal Fowler as David Crabtree
- Linzi Hateley as Helen
- Alecky Blythe as BBC newsreader

== Production ==
The film was shot in Bexley, London. A number of cast members from the original production reprise their roles in the film, including Burt, Moore, Shaeffer, Thornley, Fowler, and Holder. Kate Fleetwood, who portrayed Julie in the original production, appears here in the role of Vicky.

== Release ==
The live film premiere was screened in cinemas across the UK as part of National Theatre Live on 9 June 2015 and was released on 12 June 2015.

=== Critical reception ===
London Road received generally positive reviews from critics. Review aggregator website Rotten Tomatoes reports 76% of 67 critics gave the film a positive review, with an average rating of 6.8/10. The site's critical consensus reads, "Equal parts enthralling and unsettling, London Road uses an unusual documentary/musical hybrid to tell a grim true-life tale."

== Accolades ==
The film's choreographer, Javier de Frutos, was nominated for and won the 2017 Chita Rivera Award for Outstanding Choreography in a Feature Film, beating fellow nominees Beauty and the Beast and La La Land. The film was nominated for two awards at the London Film Critics Circle Awards 2015 and won one:

Wins

- British Actor of the Year - Tom Hardy (shared with his roles in, Legend, Mad Max: Fury Road, and The Revenant)

Nominations

- British Film of the Year; lost to 45 Years
