= Roman Polanski: A Film Memoir =

2011 documentary directed by Laurent Bouzereau

- Film poster
- Directed by: Laurent Bouzereau
- Produced by: Luca Barbareschi; Andrew Braunsberg; Christoph Fisser; Henning Molfenter; Charlie Woebcken
- Starring: Roman Polanski; Andrew Braunsberg
- Cinematography: Paweł Edelman
- Edited by: Jeff Pickett
- Music by: Alexandre Desplat
- Production companies: Anagram Films; Casanova Multimedia; Studio Babelsberg
- Distributed by: Eclipse Features
- Release date: September 27, 2011 (Zurich Film Festival)
- Running time: 90 minutes
- Countries: United Kingdom; Italy; Germany
- Language: English

Roman Polanski: A Film Memoir is a 2011 documentary film directed by Laurent Bouzereau. The film is about Roman Polanski's life, career, and legal issues.

== Synopsis ==
In two conversations (one while on house arrest due to his arrest in September 2009 and other as a "free man") with his longtime friend Andrew Braunsberg, the filmmaker Roman Polanski discusses his life, career and the legal issues he has been facing since his 1977 arrest for sexual assault.

== Cast ==
- Roman Polanski as himself
- Andrew Braunsberg as himself

== Reception ==
As of June 2020, Roman Polanski: A Film Memoir has an approval rating of 91% on review aggregator Rotten Tomatoes, based on 11 reviews with an average rating of 5.86/10.

Christopher Schobert from the IndieWire wrote: "Roman Polanski: A Film Memoir is a rare opportunity to hear a master filmmaker speak about his life. Both his haters and fans will agree, it is a highly watchable documentary. But don't expect either group to feel they have heard the whole story".

Roman Polanski: A Film Memoir was nominated in the category Best Documentary at the 2012 British Independent Film Awards, but lost it for The Imposter.
