= Kate Fleetwood =

English actress

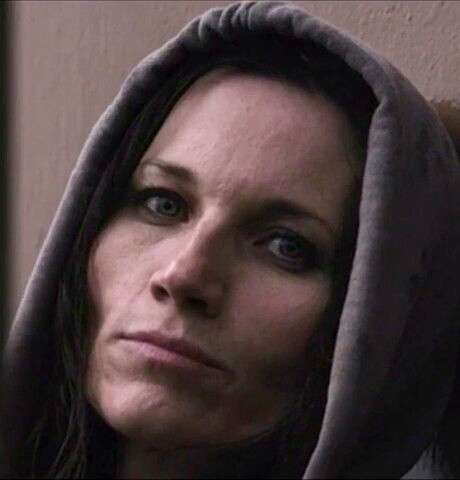
- Fleetwood in London Road, 2015
- Born: 24 September 1972 (age 54); Cirencester, Gloucestershire, England
- Years active: 1995–present
- Spouse: Rupert Goold (m. 2001)
- Children: 2

Kate Fleetwood (born 24 September 1972) is an English actress. She was nominated for a Tony Award for her performance as Lady Macbeth in Macbeth, at Chichester Festival Theatre, the West End, and Broadway. Additionally, she received an Olivier Award nomination in 2012 for her performance as Julie in London Road at the National Theatre. Her film and television credits include Vanity Fair (2004), Harry Potter and the Deathly Hallows – Part 1 (2010), Macbeth (2010), Philomena (2013), London Road (2015), Harlots (2017–2019), and The Wheel of Time (2021–2025).

== Early years and education ==
Kate Fleetwood was born in England in 1972 or 1973 and grew up on a farm near Stratford-upon-Avon.

She attended Trinity Catholic School in Leamington Spa, and began her career at the Royal Shakespeare Company during her childhood.

Fleetwood is a graduate of Exeter University.

== Career ==
In 2008, Fleetwood was nominated for a Tony Award for her performance as Lady Macbeth in Macbeth, opposite Patrick Stewart, which first opened at Chichester Festival Theatre and was transferred to the West End and Broadway,

In 2012, she was nominated for the Laurence Olivier Award for Best Actress in a Musical, for her performance as Julie in London Road at the National Theatre.

== Other activities ==
Fleetwood is patron of En Masse Theatre, and joint patron, with husband Rupert Goold, of Escape Arts' youth arts work.

== Personal life ==
Fleetwood is married to Rupert Goold, who directed her in Macbeth.

== Acting credits ==
=== Theatre ===
Year	Name	Role	Theatre	Ref.
1985	Mary, After the Queen	Young Mary	Whitbread Flowers Warehouse, RSC (credited as Catherine Fleetwood)	
1986	A Midsummer Night's Dream	Mustardseed	Royal Shakespeare Theatre, RSC (credited as Catherine Fleetwood)	
1995	Love Is the Drug	Flamina	Oxford Stage Company (OSC)	—N/a
1996	Twelfth Night	Viola	OSC	—N/a
1996	Swaggers	Nancy	Old Red Lion Theatre	—N/a
1997	The Comic Mysteries	Death/Gabriel	UK tour	—N/a
1998	Romeo and Juliet	Juliet	UK tour	—N/a
1998	Arabian Nights	Dinarzard/Parizade	Young Vic	—N/a
1999	Ghosts	Regina	Theatre Royal Plymouth	—N/a
1999	Nativity	Balthazar	Young Vic	—N/a
2000	The Two Noble Kinsmen	The Gaoler's Daughter	Shakespeare's Globe	—N/a
2000	The Tempest	Iris	Shakespeare's Globe	—N/a
2001	Tender	Tash	Hampstead Theatre/ Birmingham Rep/ Theatre Royal Plymouth	—N/a
2001	Medea	Chorus	Queen's Theatre	—N/a
2002	Mariana Pineda	Mariana Pineda	Gate Theatre	—N/a
2003	Love's Labour's Lost	Rosaline	National Theatre	—N/a
2003	A Midsummer Night's Dream	Helena	Bristol Old Vic	—N/a
2003	Othello	Desdemona	Theatre Royal Northampton	—N/a
2004	Hecuba	Polyxena	Donmar Warehouse	—N/a
2006	Pericles	Thaisa	RSC	—N/a
2006	The Winter's Tale	Hermione	RSC	—N/a
2014	King Lear	Goneril	National Theatre	—N/a
2014	National Theatre Live: King Lear	Goneril	National Theatre Live	—N/a
2015	High Society	Tracy Lord	The Old Vic	—N/a
2015	Medea	Medea	Almeida Theatre	—N/a
2017	Ugly Lies the Bone	Jess	National Theatre	—N/a
2018	Absolute Hell	Christine	National Theatre	—N/a
2022	101 Dalmatians	Cruella de Vil	Regent's Park Open Air Theatre	—N/a
2024	A View from the Bridge	Beatrice	Ustinov Studio/Theatre Royal Haymarket	—N/a
2025	My Master Builder	Elena Solness	Wyndham's Theatre	—N/a
2025-2027	Into the Woods	The Witch	Bridge Theatre/Noel Coward Theatre, West End	—N/a

=== Film ===
Year	Film	Role	Notes
1998	Getting Hurt	Prostitute	TV film
2004	Vanity Fair	Miss Pinkerton's Crone	
2006	After Thomas	Kate	TV film
2007	Elizabeth: The Golden Age	Woman with Baby	
2009	Breaking the Mould	Margaret Jennings	TV film
2010	Harry Potter and the Deathly Hallows – Part 1	Mary Cattermole	
2010	Macbeth	Lady Macbeth	TV film
2012	Les Misérables	Factory Woman 1	
2013	Philomena	Young Sister Hildegarde	
2014	National Theatre Live: King Lear	Goneril	
2015	London Road	Vicky	
2015	Star Wars: The Force Awakens	First Order Officer	
2016	The People Next Door	Yvonne	TV film
2016	Deliverers	Eve	
2018	Beirut	Alice Riley	
2022	Choose or Die	Laura	Netflix

=== Television/OTT ===
Year	Title	Role	Network	Notes
2001	Holby City	Karina	BBC One	Episode: "Tip of the Iceberg"
2001	The Infinite Worlds of H. G. Wells	Maggie	Hallmark Channel	Episode: "Brownlow's Newspaper"
2001	EastEnders	Karen	BBC One	4 episodes
2001	Urban Gothic	Woman	Channel 5	Episode: "The End"
2002	Doctors	Anna Fielding	BBC One	Episode: "Deceptive Appearances"
2002	Dalziel and Pascoe	Jill Lowry	BBC One	Episode: "The Unwanted"
2004	The Bill	Lois Townsend	ITV	Episode: "Smoking Gun"
2004	Silent Witness	Sienna Ricci	BBC One	Episode: "Death by Water"
2005	Twisted Tales	Jacqueline	Fox	Episode: "Flat Four"
2005	Murphy's Law	Jill	BBC One	Episode: "Strongbox"
2005	Midsomer Murders	Sarah Douglas	ITV	Episode: "Midsomer Rhapsody"
2005	Nathan Barley	Mandy	Channel 4	Episode: "Pilot"
2007	Foyle's War	Lydia Nicholson	ITV	Episode: "Casualties of War"
2009	Hustle	MP Rhona Christie	BBC One	Episode: "Politics"
2009	Casualty 1909	Grace Barnes	BBC One	Episode: #1.4
2009	Waking the Dead	Zoe Morrison	BBC One	Episode: "End of the Night"
2009	The Sarah Jane Adventures	Ship	CBBC	Episode: "The Mad Woman in the Attic"
2012	A Touch of Cloth	Kate Cloth	Sky One	Episode: "The First Case"
2013	Way to Go	Amanda	BBC Three	Episode: "Dead End"
2014	The Widower	Felicity Webster	ITV	Series regular
2016	War & Peace	Anisya	BBC One	Episode: #1.4
2017–2019	Harlots	Nancy Birch	ITV Encore	Series regular
2019	Victoria	Princess Feodora	ITV	Series regular
2019–2023	Rise of the Nazis	Narrator	BBC Two	12 episodes
2020	Brave New World	Sheila	Peacock	4 episodes
2021–2022	Fate: The Winx Saga	Queen Luna	Netflix	Recurring cast
2022	The Elon Musk Show	n/a	BBC	Narrator
2021–2025	The Wheel of Time	Liandrin Guirale	Prime Video	Series regular
2025	Wolf King	Amelie, Tilly	Netflix	Voice
2025	Frauds	Celine	ITV	2 episodes

=== Video games ===
Year	Title	Role(s)	Notes	Source
2010	Harry Potter and the Deathly Hallows – Part 1	Mary Cattermole, Witches		
2013	Assassin's Creed IV: Black Flag	Additional voices	Multiplayer only	
2017	Mass Effect: Andromeda	Additional voices		
2019	Anthem	Chronicler		
2021	Sniper: Ghost Warrior - Contracts 2	Additional voices		
2024	Dragon Age: The Veilguard	Mythal		

== Accolades ==
Year	Award	Category	Work	Result	Ref.
2008	Tony Awards	Best Actress in a Play	Macbeth, Bridge Theatre	Nominated	
2012	Laurence Olivier Awards	Best Actress in a Musical	London Road, National Theatre	Nominated	
2012	WhatsOnStage Awards	Best Ensemble Performance	London Road, National Theatre	Won	
2026	Critics' Circle Theatre Award	Best Actress	Into the Woods, Bridge Theatre	Nominated	
2026	Laurence Olivier Awards	Best Actress in a Supporting Role in a Musical	Into the Woods, Bridge Theatre	Nominated	

== See also ==
- List of British actors
