= Game of Thrones: The Mad King =

Stage play by Duncan Macmillan

- Written by: Duncan Macmillan
- Based on: A Song of Ice and Fire by George R. R. Martin
- Genre: Drama; High fantasy

Premiere
- Date: 8 August 2026
- Place: Royal Shakespeare Theatre, Stratford-upon-Avon
- Directed by: Dominic Cooke

Game of Thrones: The Mad King (also marketed as George R. R. Martin's Game of Thrones: The Mad King) is a stage play by Duncan Macmillan. It is a prequel to the epic high fantasy novel series A Song of Ice and Fire by George R. R. Martin and the first stage play adaptation in the Game of Thrones franchise.

== Premise ==
The play is set 10 years before A Game of Thrones, amidst a tournament at Harrenhal. Members of the inner circle of the titular "Mad King", Aerys II, plot against him, as fears grow about his accelerating ruthlessness.

== Production history ==
On 18 February 2026, it was announced that the play would be presented by the Royal Shakespeare Company, with its world premiere at the Royal Shakespeare Theatre in Stratford-upon-Avon, directed by Dominic Cooke. Full casting was announced on 29 May 2026.

Previews were scheduled to begin on 20 July 2026, however the first weeks previews were cancelled, one with just a few hours notice. The official opening night was on 8 August and ran until 5 September.

On 4 September 2026, it was announced that the production will transfer to London in 2027, with full details including venue and dates to be confirmed.

== Cast and characters ==
Character	Stratford-upon-Avon
Character	2026
King Aerys II "The Mad King" Targaryen	Michael Shaeffer
Prince Rhaegar Targaryen	Noah Ritter
Lord Robert Baratheon	Callum Woodhouse
Eddard Stark	Michael Abubakar
Lyanna Stark	Harmony Rose-Bremner
Queen Rhaella Targaryen / Lady Shella Whent	Mariah Gale
Cersei Lannister / Golda Whent	Daisy Franks
Brandon Stark	Luke Brady
Ser Jaime Lannister	Maxim Ays
Catelyn Stark	Marty Breen
Lord Varys	Hughie O’Donnell
Ser Jonothor Darry / Lord Tywin Lannister	Marcello Walton
Lord Rickard Stark	Alexander Newland
Prince Oberyn Martell	Edem-Ita Duke
Princess Elia Martell	Elizabeth Ayodele
Ashara Dayne	Tanisha Spring
Ser Arthur Dayne	Kel Matsena
Ser Gerold Hightower	Shaun Yusuf McKee
Ser Barristan Selmy	Daniel Hawksford
Grand Maester Pycelle	Richard Hansell
Lord Whent / Wisdom Rossart	Tom Larkin
Benjen Stark	Miles Barrow
Howland Reed	Islam Bouakkaz
Ser Oswell Whent	Huw Parmenter
Prince Lewyn Martell	Adrian Christopher
Yoren	Lewis Howard
Owen Merryweather	Sebastian Charles
Qarlton Chelsted	Fred Davis

== Critical reception ==
The play was strongly praised by the critics, especially the production. Sarah Crompton of WhatsOnStage gave the play five stars stating that it is "an extraordinary moment of theatre: a procession of rich coloured silks and fluttering banners, with kings and princes riding life sized armoured horses, heads tossing as they move, a scrappy dog silhouetted barking at the scene". Mark Lawson of The Guardian wrote, "This prequel to the TV series has one joust after another, spectacular stagecraft and plenty of modern resonance". Chris McPherson from Collider agreed saying, "The technical achievement is frequently jaw-dropping (...) The opening Targaryen procession will live long in the memory, as they cross the stage on their horses with ominous music playing". Alice Saville of The Independent rated the play four out of five stars and wrote, "As well as drawing on the ancient Classics, this story of ambitious, vengeful kings has serious shades of Shakespeare – with added dragons. It feels right on this in-the-round, Elizabethan-inspired stage".

However, not all aspects of the play were positively received. Despite giving the play four stars, Dominic Cavendish of The Telegraph said, "At almost four hours, it’s a long evening, sometimes too dense with detail, and it lacks the grit and gore (not to mention the nudity) of the TV series". The sentiment on the play's length was shared by McPherson stating, "It's an odd, paradoxical conundrum because, at approximately four hours, including an interval, The Mad King is too long and yet it feels rushed in that second half". In a scathing review by The Times, Clive Davis gave the play three stars and wrote, "This prequel to a blood-soaked dynastic saga wanders on for so long that it makes Christopher Nolan’s journey into Greek mythology seem a model of understatement (...) only the most dedicated of [the fans] will have the energy for this marathon".
