= London Road (musical) =

- Cover of the published text
- Music: Adam Cork
- Lyrics: Alecky Blythe; Adam Cork
- Book: Alecky Blythe
- Basis: Interviews about the Steve Wright killings
- Productions: 2011 Royal National Theatre; 2014 Bristol Old Vic Theatre School; 2015 film adaptation 2016 Bridewell Theatre; 2017 Cambridge; 2017 Mountview Academy of Theatre Arts; 2018 University of South Carolina Upstate; 2022 Rose Bruford College; 2023 University of Chichester Conservatoire; 2025 Royal National Theatre; 2026 Arts Educational Schools London

London Road is a musical written by Alecky Blythe (book and lyrics) and Adam Cork (music and lyrics). The production, directed by Rufus Norris, opened at the National Theatre's Cottesloe theatre in London, United Kingdom, on 14 April 2011 after seven previews.

== Overview ==
The musical is set in and around London Road in Ipswich, Suffolk, during the Ipswich serial murders and subsequent trial of killer Steve Wright in 2006–2008. The piece is written in verbatim style, meaning the spoken text is reproduced by the performers exactly as recorded in interviews, in this case conducted by Blythe with the residents of London Road and some of the women who worked as prostitutes there, as well as members of the media who gathered in the area to report the news. The lyrics in the musical segments are similarly derived from the interviews as recorded, with the meter, pitch and rhythm of the music following the patterns of the original recorded speech as closely as possible.

Neither the murdered women nor their killer are depicted, nor are the murders themselves; rather, the piece is concerned with the residents as they cope with the events unfolding around them, the media attention drawn to their neighbourhood, and their attempts to rebuild and regenerate their community afterwards. The piece does not feature principal characters in the conventional sense; instead, an ensemble cast assume the roles of various locals, sex workers and reporters, and most characters are not referred to by name.

The score is orchestrated for woodwind ensemble, guitar, electric guitar, keyboards and percussion.

== Musical numbers ==
- "Good Evening, Welcome"
- "London Road in Bloom"
- "Everyone Is Very Very Nervous"
- "It Could Be Him"
- "Shaving Scratch"
- "And That's When It All Started"
- "They Like a Good Moan"
- "It's a Wicked Bloody World"
- "The Plea"
- "Ten Weeks"
- "Cellular Material"
- "We've All Stopped"
- "The Verdict"
- "Everyone Smile"
- "Interview"
- "London Road in Bloom" (Reprise)

== Original cast ==
- Nick Holder (Ron)
- Nicola Sloane (Rosemary)
- Kate Fleetwood (Julie)
- Rosalie Craig (Helen)
- Duncan Wisbey (Gordon)
- Clare Burt (Jan)
- Hal Fowler (Tim)
- Paul Thornley (Dodge)
- Howard Ward (Terry)
- Michael Shaeffer (Alfie)
- Claire Moore (June)

== Reception ==
The musical opened to almost unanimous critical acclaim, garnering five-star ratings from the Evening Standard, Financial Times, The Independent, The Mail on Sunday, The Independent on Sunday, The Sunday Times, Metro, The Sunday Express and Time Out magazine.

Many of the reviews made reference to the potentially controversial musical treatment of the source material, for example, critic Michael Coveney of The Independent wrote: "Doubters can be assured there is no "cashing in" on the tragedy, rather a deep, abiding sadness that it happened at all, and even a slight, knowingly shameful admission that something good has come out of it: a reborn community and a renewal of civic pride."

London Road won Best Musical at the 2011 Critics' Circle Theatre Awards, held on 24 January 2012.

== Revivals ==
In July 2012 the production was revived for a short season in the National's Olivier Theatre. The revival ran for 29 performances between 28 July and 6 September 2012.

In 2014 Bristol Old Vic Theatre School staged performances of London Road from 10 to 21 June 2014 in the Bristol Old Vic Studio. The production was directed by Nicholas Bone with musical direction by Pamela Rudge.

In 2016, SEDOS staged a production at the Bridewell Theatre in London from 27th July - 6th August. It was directed by Matt Gould with musical direction by Jordan Clarke. Playwright Alecky Blythe attended and praised the production.

In 2018 University of South Carolina Upstate's Shoestring Players performed from April 12 to 15 in Spartanburg, South Carolina. The production was directed by Jimm Cox. This is believed to be the debut of London Road in the United States.

In 2023, Chicago's Shattered Globe Theatre presented the professional stateside debut of London Road.

In 2026, Arts Educational Schools London presented London Road as part of their 2025/26 season. The production was directed by James Robert Moore, with choreography by Leanne Pinder and musical direction by Geraint Owen.

== Film adaptation ==
A film adaptation was announced in July 2013. The film, directed by Rufus Norris, began production in February 2014 and was produced by the National Theatre, BBC Films and Cuba Pictures. The film respectively features Tom Hardy and Olivia Colman in the roles of Mark, a taxi driver and Julie, the organiser of Ipswich's Neighbourhood Watch. The live film premiere was screened in cinemas across the UK as part of National Theatre Live on 9 June 2015 and on general release in cinemas on 12 June 2015.

== Awards and nominations ==
=== Original London production ===
Year	Award	Category	Nominee	Result
2011	Critics' Circle Theatre Award	Best Musical (Peter Hepple Award)		Won
2011	Evening Standard Theatre Award	Best Musical (Ned Sherrin Award)		Nominated
2012	Laurence Olivier Award	Best New Musical		Nominated
2012	Laurence Olivier Award	Best Actress in a Musical	Kate Fleetwood	Nominated
2012	Laurence Olivier Award	Best Director	Rufus Norris	Nominated
2012	Laurence Olivier Award	Best Theatre Choreographer	Javier de Frutos	Nominated
