= Inbred (film) =

- Directed by: Alex Chandon
- Written by: Alex Chandon; Paul Shrimpton
- Produced by: Margaret Milner; Yazid Benfeghoul; Michael Kraetzer
- Starring: Jo Hartley; Seamus O'Neill; James Doherty; James Burrows; Neil Leiper; Dominic Brunt
- Cinematography: Ollie Downey
- Edited by: Oliver Griffin
- Music by: Dave Andrews
- Production companies: New Flesh Films; Split Second Films
- Release dates: 29 August 2011 (Film4 FrightFest); 8 October 2012 (United Kingdom)
- Running time: 90 minutes
- Countries: United Kingdom; Germany
- Language: English
- Budget: £1.3 million
- Box office: $24

Inbred is a 2011 British and Irish horror comedy splatter film directed by Alex Chandon and co-written with Paul Shrimpton and produced by Margaret Milner Schmueck.

== Plot ==
Four young offenders – Tim, Sam, Dwight, and Zeb – and their caretakers – Kate and Jeff – travel to a Yorkshire village called Mortlake to do community service, staying in a little cottage. On their first day they decide to have a drink at the local pub where they meet Jim, the bartender. The next day they go salvage abandoned trains where Tim and Sam are attacked by three inbreds. Jeff tries to scare them away but falls on a metal shard, cutting open his femoral artery.

They go back to the pub to get help, but Jim chops Jeff's head off with a cleaver and traps the others in the cellar. The inbreds take Zeb away and pin him to the ground in a barn. It turns out he's being used for a show for the Mortlakers. Zeb is then taunted and tortured by having asparagus stuck up his nose. They bring in a horse and have it walk around Zeb while the others pick the lock off the cellar door and escape. The horse then crushes Zeb's head, killing him. The others escape while Dwight attempts to defend them, but Dwight is unsuccessful and gets recaptured and used for another show. Dwight gets tied to a chair and has fecal matter pumped inside his body, popping his eyes out and blowing up his stomach. The others run back to the cottage in an attempt to find a map with directions, as well as their cellphones, which Jeff had confiscated and hid.

Kate goes to check the shed but when she opens the door, Jim is standing there with a weapon and a group of inbreds. She locks the door but he shoots the lock and her fingers off. Later, Kate runs outside to distract them in an attempt to save Tim and Sam. She tries to run away but steps on a mantrap. One of the inbreds then amputates her leg with a chainsaw. She tries to crawl away but Jim shoots her dead. Tim checks the basement and finds a load of booze. He then lures the inbreds down into the basement while Sam runs away. They find Tim holding a Molotov cocktail. He tries to light it but Jim tells him that the alcohol isn't strong enough to burn and the inbreds kill him. When they find Sam running away outside, they bet on how she'll die. She steps on a landmine and tries not to move, but a ferret crawls up her leg, so she is blown up. The film ends with the inbreds walking back to the pub for a pint.

== Cast ==
- Jo Hartley as Kate
- Seamus O'Neill as Jim
- James Doherty as Jeff
- James Burrows as Tim
- Neil Leiper as Gris
- Chris Waller as Dwight
- Nadine Rose Mulkerrin as Sam
- Terry Haywood as Zeb
- Damien Lloyd-Davies as Rats
- Derek Melling as Greg
- Mark Rathbone as Ron
- Dominic Brunt as Podge
- Emily Booth as June
- Simon Coomes as Toby

== Production ==
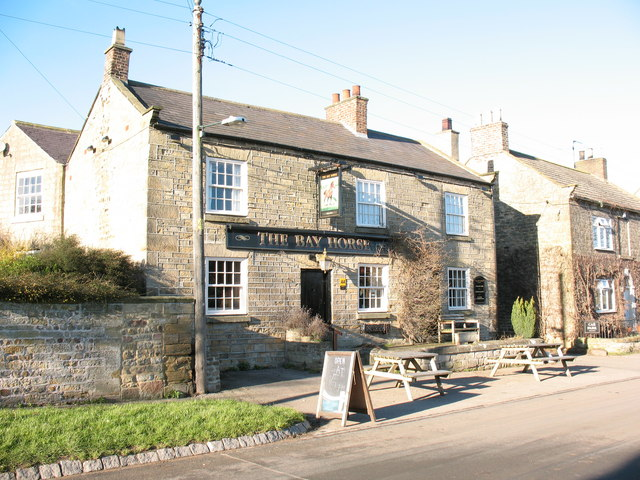
The Bay Horse in Rainton, used as The Dirty Hole

Inbred was mainly shot in, and around Thirsk in North Yorkshire, home of co-writer Paul Shrimpton. Locals did object to the film, leading to local councilor and mayor Derek Adamson to say, "We don't want that sort of publicity. ... It’s quite probable that people will think the characters in the film are like real Thirsk people and that is not a good impression." He also expressed concerns based on Chandon's earlier movies: "If it’s anything like his previous work then I don't think he will be really welcome here". However, Chandon says Adamson's opinions changed later on: "Once he learned it was a comedy he got on board, but his little quote got us so much publicity worldwide. He was integral to the whole Inbred machine."

The bulk of the special effects were done physically with some CGI for aspects that were difficult to replicate.

The company in charge of the production arrangements was Split Second Films.

== Release ==
The film did the rounds of festivals, premièring at FrightFest in August 2011, before going on general release around Britain in September 2012.

The film was released on DVD and Blu-ray in the UK in October 2012. XLrator Media released it on video-on-demand 22 August 2013 and on DVD 24 September 2013.

== Reception ==
The response from professional critics was largely negative. Rotten Tomatoes, a review aggregator, reports that 18% of 11 surveyed critics gave the film a positive review.

The Daily Telegraph's review was: "Patience-sappingly foul British horror film in which a brood of ravening yokels torment inner-city teens on a weekend retreat." Mike McCahill reviewed the film for The Guardian and said that "both the comedy and horror rake over old ground. The warped variety show the kids stumble into ... owes too much to Python, The League of Gentlemen and Channel 4's late-night gem Focus North". Total Film concluded "All-out gore is the USP, but it’s served with such pernicious cynicism (is casting people with genuine disabilities as freaks OK?) and terrible dialogue ... only the persistent will stick around to count all The League Of Gentlemen steals." The Radio Times flagged up "weaknesses in pacing, plot and characterisation" but, thanks to the enthusiastic acting and gory special effects, "[t]hese crowd-pleasing elements distract from a multitude of sins".

However, other reviewers enjoyed the film. Ain't It Cool News picked it as one of their favourite horror films of the year with the recommendation that "[n]o self respecting gorehound should miss INBRED." Diabolique magazine wrote that Inbred "offers viewers a genuinely weird and creepy story about redemption that benefits greatly from exceptional casting, spooky locations, and gruesome special makeup effects". Twitch Film concluded, "Awfully mean-spirited and often sickeningly gory, I would normally never recommend the likes of "Inbred". But the technical virtues of filmmaking on display here, coupled with a roster of well-played incredible characters, go far in redeeming the film. So if you have the stomach for it I do urge you to check this out." Sky Movies recommended it saying "there's a joyous celebration of the depraved" and "unlike a lot of low-budget horror schlock, there's a decent cast delivering wry-if-cartoonish dialogue." Dread Central warned that a potential viewer should not "go into Inbred looking for a genuinely horrific, or even particularly thrilling or tense, piece of work – you won't find that here. What you will find, though, is an amusing (if you’re an appreciator of dark/broad humour), deliciously gory, occasionally shocking and decidedly vicious little film." Paul Mount of Starburst declared that "Inbred may well be the grossest, sickest horror movie this reviewer has ever laid eyes on" and drew parallels with "The League of Gentlemen dialed up to eleven and mix in a bit of The Texas Chain Saw Massacre, Straw Dogs and maybe The Hills Have Eyes", concluding "this is pitch-black stuff and its humour is as dark as night - and as such it does what it sets out to do and is a triumph of its type." Despite the possibly disrespectful take on its home county, The Yorkshire Post said the film "combines gruesome shocks with genuine humour", suggests it is "[f]rom the same genre as Simon Sprackling's deliriously demented Funny Man" and ends up by stating that Inbred "has to be seen to be believed... it proves that classic British horror is alive and twitching."
