= Chantry Academy =

Coordinates: 52.0450°N 1.1296°E

Location
- Mallard Way; Ipswich, Suffolk, IP2 9LR; England

Information
- Type: Academy
- Motto: VALUED (Versatile, Aspirational, Learning, Understanding, Engaged, Determined)
- Department for Education URN: 138373 Tables
- Ofsted: Reports
- Principal: Dean Rosembert
- Gender: Co-educational
- Age: 11 to 16
- Colours: Orange, Blue, Black, Grey
- Website: chantryacademy.org

Chantry Academy (formerly Suffolk New Academy and Chantry High School) is a secondary school with academy status in the Chantry area of Ipswich in the English county of Suffolk. The school educates children aged 11 to 16 and has around 750 pupils. The past principal, Craig D'Cunha, took up the post in February 2015. The current principal is Mr Dean Rosembert.

In 2018, the academy received a 'good' Ofsted inspection rating.

== History ==
The school opened in September 1962 as a secondary modern school serving the recently established council estate of Chantry in southwest Ipswich. Originally, the school consisted of the two three-floored 'A' and 'G' blocks with a main school hall area. Following the growth of the estate, the school's roll grew rapidly into the 1970s, resulting in the extension of the site. The school remained a secondary modern school until the late 1970s when Suffolk became fully comprehensive and the school was renamed Chantry High School.

In March 2012, the school announced its intentions to convert to academy status in collaboration with Suffolk New College. This conversion was finalised during the following academic year, when the school was renamed Suffolk New Academy.

During the summer of 2014, the old 'G' block was demolished in preparation for the building work of a brand new school on the existing site. This building work took place throughout the 2014–15 academic year, and saw rise to the construction of a three-storey building plus sports hall. The old 'A' block was subsequently demolished in the summer of 2015, with the remaining old buildings due to follow suit.

In early 2015, the school announced that the Active Learning Trust would be taking over sponsorship from September 2015. This would coincide with the opening of the new school building and another name change. In May 2015, following a public consultation, the school changed its name to Chantry Academy, which had received 66% of the public vote.

Before D'Chuna took charge of the high school, Ofsted (an organisation which judges schools to determine how efficient a school is) reported that the school was put into "special measures". As of 2024, the secondary school has now been judged Good by Ofsted.

== Sixth Form Centre ==
In 1981 the school opened a sixth form centre. Originally, it served Chantry, East Bergholt, Stoke, Copleston, Kesgrave, and numerous smaller schools, acting as an alternative to the already established Northgate Sixth Form centre.

In the 1990s, due to the increase of Sixth Form Centres within Ipswich, Chantry Sixth Form Centre predominantly served just the Chantry and Stoke areas. It closed following the development of the One sixth form in September 2010.
