= One (sixth form college) =

Location
- Scrivener Drive; Ipswich, Suffolk, IP8 3SU; England

Information
- Type: Sixth form college
- Established: 2010
- Ofsted: Reports
- Head of Centre: Jake Robson
- Assistant Head of Centre: Andrew Adamson
- Gender: Coeducational
- Age: 16 to 19
- Enrolment: 1750 as of May 2015
- Capacity: 2036
- Publication: One Magazine
- Website: suffolkone.ac.uk

One (formerly Suffolk One) is a sixth form college in Ipswich in the English county of Suffolk. Opened in 2010, and a member of the South West Ipswich and South Suffolk (SWISS) Partnership, it provides further education in South Suffolk. The College was assessed as 'Outstanding' by Ofsted in May 2015 and again in April 2022.

== Design ==
Due to the noise generated by the adjoining busy dual carriageway, it was not possible to use natural ventilation in the teaching spaces. The Mechanical and Engineering consultants, John Packer Associates, aimed to use low energy and sustainable technologies wherever possible to reduce energy consumption and carbon emissions across the site, whilst maintaining comfortable internal conditions for academic development. The use of Interseasonal Heat Transfer from ICAX, using the 1,600 metre square bus turning area as a concrete solar collector made this possible. Heat collected in summer is stored in thermal banks in the ground for retrieval in winter by ground source heat pumps to enable natural heating to be provided without burning fossil fuels.
