= Broken (2012 film) =

2012 film by Rufus Norris

- Theatrical release poster
- Directed by: Rufus Norris
- Screenplay by: Mark O'Rowe
- Based on: Broken by Daniel Clay
- Produced by: Dixie Linder; Tally Garner; Nick Marston; Bill Kenwright
- Starring: Tim Roth; Cillian Murphy; Rory Kinnear; Robert Emms; Zana Marjanović; Clare Burt; Bill Milner; Denis Lawson; Eloise Laurence
- Cinematography: Rob Hardy
- Edited by: Victoria Boydell
- Music by: Electric Wave Bureau
- Production companies: Cuba Pictures; BBC Films; British Film Institute; LipSync Productions; Bill Kenwright Films
- Distributed by: StudioCanal
- Release dates: 17 May 2012 (Cannes); 8 March 2013 (United Kingdom)
- Running time: 91 minutes
- Country: United Kingdom
- Language: English

Broken is a 2012 British coming-of-age drama film directed by Rufus Norris in his feature directorial debut. The screenplay, written by Mark O'Rowe, is based on Daniel Clay's 2008 novel of the same name and inspired by Harper Lee's 1960 novel To Kill a Mockingbird. The film stars Tim Roth, Cillian Murphy, and Eloise Laurence, with Rory Kinnear, Robert Emms, Zana Marjanović, Clare Burt, Bill Milner, and Denis Lawson in supporting roles. It tells the story of a young girl in North London and the changes she experiences after witnessing a violent attack.

The film premiered at the 65th Cannes Film Festival on 17 May 2012, and was theatrically released in the United Kingdom on 8 March 2013, by StudioCanal. It received mixed-to-positive reviews from critics, who mostly praised Norris' direction and the performances of the cast. At the 15th British Independent Film Awards, it earned a leading nine nominations and won in two categories: Best British Independent Film and Best Supporting Actor (for Kinnear). Norris was nominated for the European Discovery at the 25th European Film Awards.

== Plot ==
Eleven-year-old diabetic Emily 'Skunk' Cunningham lives with her solicitor father Archie, her elder brother Jed, and nanny Kasia on a cul-de-sac in a British suburb. Her mother left many years ago with an accountant from Birmingham, and she has a deep fondness for hearing the story of the dream her father had the night of her birth, where he dreamt he saw her as an adult. One of Skunk's few friends is Rick Buckley, an unstable young man living with his parents, Janet and Dave Buckley, in a nearby house. She is also extremely attached to Kasia's boyfriend Mike, whom Kasia has been dating for four years, and who visits regularly.

Skunk is shocked when Rick gets beaten up by single-father Mr. Oswald, a widowed neighbour with three daughters, Saskia, Susan, and Sunrise: Susan has falsely accused Rick of rape (whom the three sisters have been bullying) after her father assumes she is sexually active and insists she gives him the name of the boy she has been sleeping with. Rick is released when Susan is medically examined and found to be a virgin, but he closes himself off, starting to experience a full mental breakdown. He is sectioned after refusing to leave his room and harming his father with scissors, when his father tries to help him.

After an argument about Mike's fear of commitment, he and Kasia split up, and Kasia and Archie secretly become romantically involved. Skunk also begins a her first relationship with a local boy, Dillon, and when the new term starts, Mike turns out to be her English teacher, much to Skunk's delight. However, Oswald's daughters begin bullying skunk at school.

When Skunk visits Rick in hospital, he appears to have improved. While walking home from school, Skunk is attacked by Oswald's daughters Sunshine and Saskia, and rescued by Mike. When Mike brings her home, he tries to reconcile with Kasia, having overcome his commitment issues, but she tells him she is seeing Archie, news that upsets both Mike and Skunk. Shortly afterwards, Skunk's boyfriend Dillon tells her he's leaving first thing the following morning to move to Birmingham, news he had delayed telling her, distressing her further.

One of Oswald's daughters, Susan, discovers she is pregnant by one of her many sexual partners (which include Skunk's brother Jed, who is in love with her). She panics, and, on her sister Sunshine's recommendation, falsely accuses Mike. Oswald barges into Skunk's classroom and beats Mike, only stopping when Skunk leaps onto his back. Mr Oswald is arrested, and Archie provides legal services to Mike who is released without charge thanks to Archie's intervention. Oswald's daughters throw a drunken party in their father's absence, where Susan experiences a fatal miscarriage, leading to Oswald's release.

Upset about the breakup with Dillon and the news that Archie and Kasia are dating, Skunk secretly leaves the house that evening and visits Rick when she sees him through her window across the road, having been released for his first weekend at home. When she enters, she finds that Rick has broken his mother's neck when he accidentally pushed her down the stairs, then panicked and knocked his father unconscious. He refuses to let Skunk leave, and commits suicide when Skunk's diabetes takes her into a hypoglycemic coma. After Oswald returns from the hospital at dawn to tell his remaining two daughters of Susan's death, a bloodied Mr Buckley comes stumbling out of the house, having partially regained consciousness from his son's earlier attack. Oswald enters the house, finds Rick's dead body, and Skunk. He calls an ambulance and shouts out to Archie across the road.

In a dream sequence, Skunk bids farewell to the people in her life, including the recently dead, then sees her grown self, holding her baby, mirroring the story of her father's dream the night she was born. She wakes up in the hospital, with her father at her side.

== Cast ==
- Tim Roth as Archie
- Cillian Murphy as Mike Kiernan
- Rory Kinnear as Bob Oswald
- Robert Emms as Rick Buckley
- Zana Marjanović as Kasia
- Clare Burt as Mrs Buckley
- Bill Milner as Jed
- Denis Lawson as Mr Buckley
- Eloise Laurence as Skunk
- Michael Shaeffer as Desk Sergeant
- Martha Bryant as Sunrise
- Faye Daveney as Saskia
- Rosalie Kosky-Hensman as Susan
- Lily James as older Skunk
- Nell Tiger Free as Anna

== Production ==
In May 2011, it was announced that Rufus Norris would make his feature directorial debut with Broken, adapted by Mark O'Rowe from the 2008 novel of the same name by Daniel Clay. Cillian Murphy was set to star that month, while Tim Roth, Rory Kinnear, Robert Emms, Zana Marjanović, Bill Milner, and Eloise Laurence joined the cast in October 2011.

Broken was inspired by Harper Lee's 1960 classic novel To Kill a Mockingbird, but was not a literal re-imagining. The film was produced by Cuba Pictures and funded by BBC Films and the BFI in association with LipSync Productions and Bill Kenwright Films. Principal photography began on 17 October 2011 in Greater London, England, and lasted for five weeks.

== Release ==
Broken had its world premiere as the opening night film of the Critics' Week section at the 65th Cannes Film Festival on 17 May 2012. Wild Bunch handled the film's international sales.

In 2012, Le Pacte acquired French distribution rights in May, StudioCanal acquired U.K. distribution rights in July, and Film Movement acquired U.S. distribution rights in September. The film was theatrically released in France on 22 August 2012, in the United Kingdom and Ireland on 8 March 2013, and in the United States on 19 July 2013. It was released on Blu-ray in the United Kingdom on 8 July 2013.

== Reception ==
=== Critical response ===
On the review aggregator website Rotten Tomatoes, 62% of 55 critics' reviews are positive, with an average rating of 6.1/10. Metacritic, which uses a weighted average, assigned the film a score of 53 out of 100, based on 19 critics, indicating "mixed or average" reviews.

David Rooney of The Hollywood Reporter stated, "Overburdened as it is by narrative clutter and climactic melodrama, Broken is always emotionally engaging, never more so than when Laurence is at the center of a scene. She has a sweet, natural screen presence, quirky without being cute. The entire ensemble is solid, with the terrific Kinnear making an especially vivid impression as the neighbor from hell."

Fabien Lemercier of Cineuropa commented, "Broken reveals itself as a highly precise clockwork, endowed with an irresistible charm, thanks in part to a charismatic young actress (Eloise Laurence) and outstanding work on editing and music."

Charles Gant of Variety opined, "Melding heightened drama with quirky, state-of-the-nation social realism, the pic aims to undercut epic plot contrivance with naturalistic perfs and a lyrical shooting style."

Stephen Holden of The New York Times called the film "fine but unnecessarily convoluted" and wrote, "At a certain point, Mr. Norris forsakes realism for theatricalized fantasy, and Broken ultimately loses its stylistic cohesion, if not its humanity."

Mark Olsen of the Los Angeles Times remarked, "Solidly done if somewhat unremarkable, there is nothing particularly wrong with Broken, nothing that needs fixing exactly, and yet it never fully comes together."

Kevin Jagernauth of IndieWire commented, "If there's any silver lining to Broken, it's the performance of Laurence, who shines and delivers both laughs and heartache in the film. […] As for the rest of the cast, they are mostly wasted in one-dimensional roles that don't provide much growth. Broken simply can't get it together on any level, delivering a tedious drama, that for all the characters and over-emoting, doesn't have much to say."

Ben Kenigsberg of RogerEbert.com gave the film two and a half out of four stars and described it as "an absorbing coming-of-age drama that suddenly, pointlessly self-destructs with an onslaught of cheap ironies and overkill." Kenigsberg also stated, "Imagine To Kill a Mockingbird with multiple trumped-up medical emergencies and a cynically manipulative finale, and you might have a sense of how Norris's film plays by the end: broken, smashed, destroyed."

=== Accolades ===
Year	Award	Category	Recipient(s)	Result	Ref.
2012	25th European Film Awards	European Discovery – Prix FIPRESCI	Rufus Norris	Nominated	
2012	15th British Independent Film Awards	Best British Independent Film	Broken	Won	
2012	15th British Independent Film Awards	Best Director	Rufus Norris	Nominated	
2012	15th British Independent Film Awards	Douglas Hickox Award	Rufus Norris	Nominated	
2012	15th British Independent Film Awards	Best Screenplay	Mark O'Rowe	Nominated	
2012	15th British Independent Film Awards	Best Actor	Tim Roth	Nominated	
2012	15th British Independent Film Awards	Best Supporting Actor	Rory Kinnear	Won	
2012	15th British Independent Film Awards	Best Supporting Actor	Cillian Murphy	Nominated	
2012	15th British Independent Film Awards	Most Promising Newcomer	Eloise Laurence	Nominated	
2012	15th British Independent Film Awards	Best Technical Achievement	Electric Wave Bureau (Music)	Nominated	
2014	34th London Film Critics' Circle Awards	Breakthrough British Filmmaker	Rufus Norris	Nominated	
2014	34th London Film Critics' Circle Awards	Young British Performer of the Year	Eloise Laurence	Nominated	

== See also ==
- List of films featuring diabetes
