= Alecky Blythe =

British playwright and screenwriter

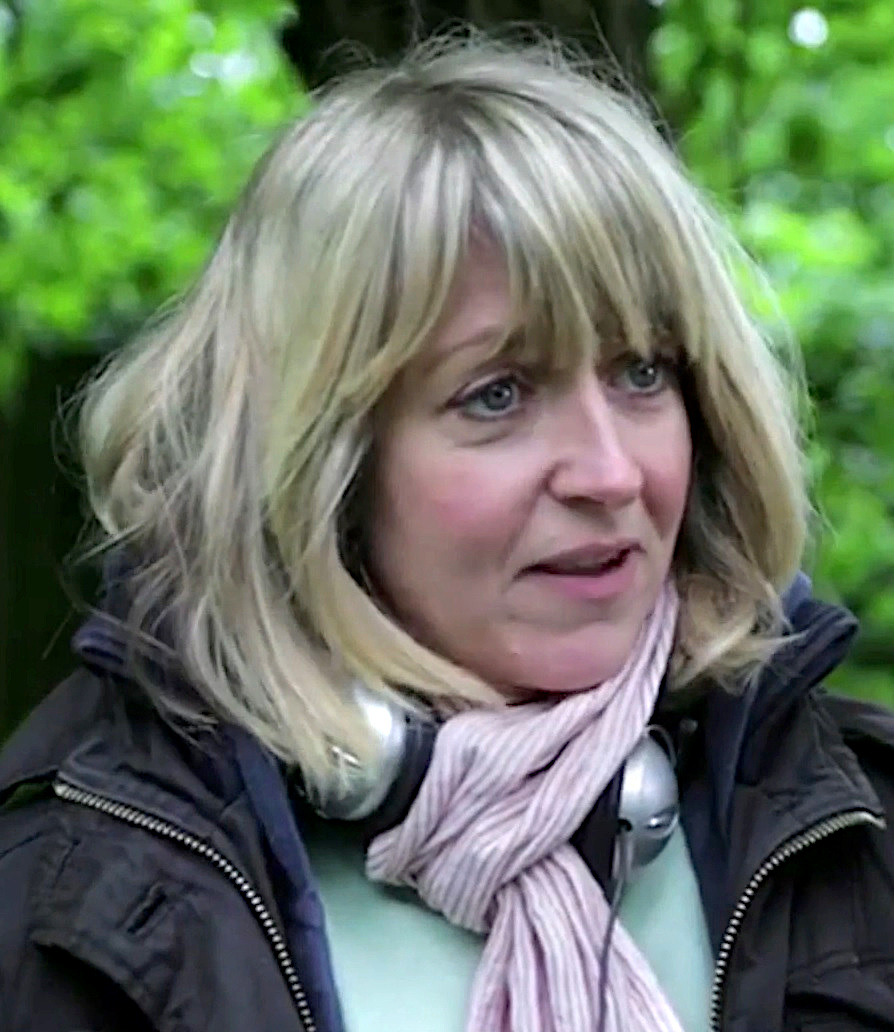
- Alecky Blythe interview from BBC Films - London Road
- Born: 1976 (age 49–50)
- Education: University of Warwick, (BA) Mountview Academy of Theatre Arts, (PGDiploma)
- Occupations: Playwright, Actor
- Years active: 2003–present

Alecky Blythe (born 1976) is a British playwright and screenwriter. She has written several plays, including the acclaimed 2011 musical London Road. Blythe is best known for her pioneering work in verbatim theatre. Her theatre company Recorded Delivery was set up in 2003 to advance this branch of theatre.

== Career ==
Alecky Blythe studied theatre at the University of Warwick before completing postgraduate studies in acting at Mountview Academy of Theatre Arts. Her first play Come Out Eli premiered at the Arcola Theatre in September 2003 and won a Time Out Award for Best Performance on the Fringe. The Girlfriend Experience premiered at the Royal Court and then transferred to the Young Vic in 2009. While researching the play she spent 18 months in a "quintessentially English" brothel in Bournemouth. Do We Look Like Refugees? won a Fringe First Award at the 2010 Edinburgh Festival.

She collaborated with composer Adam Cork to create London Road, a verbatim musical about the murders of five sex workers in Ipswich in 2006 which opened at the National Theatre's Cottesloe Theatre in 2011 to widespread acclaim. It was named Best Musical at both the Critics' Circle Awards and Standard Theatre Awards in 2011 and transferred to the National Theatre's larger Olivier stage in 2012. The show was revived for a three week run in June 2025 as part of Rufus Norris' final season as artistic director.

Her next play, Where Have I Been All My Life?, about a talent contest in Stoke-on-Trent, opened at the New Vic Theatre in April 2012. In 2014, Blythe's Little Revolution was produced at the Almeida Theatre. Blythe acted as a version of herself, and the cast included Ronni Ancona and Imogen Stubbs.

In other work, Blythe took part in Headlong Theatre's production of Decade at St Katherine's Docks. She wrote and co-directed a BBC2 documentary on the London riots. She is also working on a film script.

In June 2021, the National Theatre announced that it would stage a co-production of Our Generation with Chichester Festival Theatre early in 2022, a work based on interviews about the lives of 12 young British people, directed by the latter's artistic director Daniel Evans. The interviews took place over a period of 5 years and involved 12 young people from across the UK including Belfast, Birmingham, East of England, Glasgow, London and North Wales.

== Stage works ==
- Come Out Eli, 2003
- The Girlfriend Experience, 2009
- Do We Look Like Refugees?, 2010
- London Road, 2011 and 2025 revival
- Where Have I Been All My Life?, 2012
- Little Revolution, 2014
- Our Generation, 2022
