= 2020 WhatsOnStage Awards =

English theatre awards

- Date: 1 March 2020
- Location: Prince of Wales Theatre
- Hosted by: Jodie Prenger and Tom Read Wilson
- Most wins: & Juliet (6)
- Most nominations: & Juliet (13)

Television/radio coverage
- Network: BBC Radio 2

The WhatsOnStage Awards, founded in 2001 as the Theatregoers' Choice Awards, are a fan-driven set of awards organised by the theatre website WhatsOnStage.com, based on a popular vote recognising performers and productions of English theatre, with an emphasis on London's West End theatre.

The 2020 WhatsOnStage Awards, the 20th, took place on Sunday, 1 March 2020 at the Prince of Wales Theatre. It was hosted by theatre star Jodie Prenger and Tom Read Wilson and featured performances from all five nominees for Best New Musical, as well as the cast of The Color Purple.

For the first time in the history of the awards show, the ceremony was broadcast on BBC Radio 2 with hosts Elaine Paige and Ken Bruce providing backstage commentary and exclusive interviews with the winners, nominees and special guests. Additionally, a new category was introduced that was voted for by Radio 2 listeners which replaced the previous Best West End Show category. The Audience Award for Best Musical, was open to any musical has run for longer than one year in the West End.

Max Martin's jukebox musical & Juliet at the received a record-breaking thirteen nominations at the ceremony and was the night's biggest winner, receiving six awards. For plays, the revival of Noël Coward's Present Laughter received the most nominations with eight, winning two. Musical Come from Away was also notable for winning all five of the awards it was nominated for.

== Productions ==
The following productions received nominations at the 2020 WhatsOnStage Awards:

- & Juliet – Shaftesbury Theatre
- 9 to 5 – Savoy Theatre
- Appropriate – Donmar Warehouse
- Betrayal – Harold Pinter Theatre
- The Book of Mormon – Prince of Wales Theatre
- The Color Purple – Curve
- Come from Away – Phoenix Theatre
- Dear Evan Hansen – Noël Coward Theatre
- Death of a Salesman – Young Vic/Piccadilly Theatre
- The Doctor – Almeida Theatre
- Everybody's Talking About Jamie – Apollo Theatre
- Evita – Regent's Park Open Air Theatre
- Falsettos – The Other Palace
- Fiver – Southwark Playhouse
- Grief Is the Thing with Feathers – Barbican Theatre
- Hamilton – Victoria Palace Theatre
- High Fidelity – Turbine Theatre
- Joseph and the Amazing Technicolor Dreamcoat – London Palladium
- Les Misérables – Sondheim Theatre
- Life of Pi – Sheffield Theatres
- The Light in the Piazza – Southbank Centre
- The Lion King – Lyceum Theatre
- Lungs – The Old Vic
- Mamma Mia! – Novello Theatre
- Mame – Hope Mill Theatre
- Matilda the Musical – Cambridge Theatre
- Mary Poppins – Prince Edward Theatre
- A Midsummer Night's Dream – Bridge Theatre
- My Beautiful Laundrette – Curve/Belgrade Theatre
- The Night of the Iguana – Noël Coward Theatre
- Peter Pan – Park Theatre
- The Phantom of the Opera – Her Majesty's Theatre
- Only Fools and Horses The Musical – Theatre Royal Haymarket
- Preludes – Southwark Playhouse
- Present Laughter – The Old Vic
- Romeo & Juliet – UK Tour
- Rosmersholm – Duke of York's Theatre
- School of Rock – Gillian Lynne Theatre
- Six – Lyric Theatre
- Small Island – National Theatre Live
- Thriller – Live – Lyric Theatre
- Tina – Aldwych Theatre
- A Very Expensive Poison – The Old Vic
- The View UpStairs – Soho Theatre
- The Son – Kiln Theatre/Duke of York's Theatre
- Waitress – Adelphi Theatre
- West Side Story – Royal Exchange
- Wicked – Apollo Victoria Theatre

== Winners and nominees ==
The nominees for the 20th WhatsOnStage Awards were announced on 5 December 2019.

Best New Play	Best New Musical
Life of Pi; Appropriate; The Doctor; My Beautiful Laundrette; The Son	Come from Away; & Juliet; Dear Evan Hansen; Only Fools and Horses The Musical; Waitress
Best Play Revival	Best Musical Revival
Betrayal; A Midsummer Night's Dream; Death of a Salesman; Lungs; Present Laughter	Mary Poppins; 9 to 5; Evita; Joseph and the Amazing Technicolor Dreamcoat; Mame
Best Actor in a Play	Best Actress in a Play
Andrew Scott for Present Laughter; Tom Hiddleston for Betrayal; Laurie Kynaston for The Son; Wendell Pierce for Death of a Salesman; Matt Smith for Lungs	Claire Foy for Lungs; Zawe Ashton for Betrayal; Hayley Atwell for Rosmersholm; Sharon D. Clarke for Death of a Salesman; Juliet Stevenson for The Doctor
Best Actor in a Musical	Best Actress in a Musical
Sam Tutty for Dear Evan Hansen; David Hunter for Waitress; Charlie Stemp for Mary Poppins; Oliver Tompsett for & Juliet; Jac Yarrow for Joseph and the Amazing Technicolor Dreamcoat	Miriam-Teak Lee for & Juliet; Tracie Bennett for Mame; Lucie Jonesfor Waitress; Katharine McPhee for Waitress; Zizi Strallen for Mary Poppins
Best Supporting Actor in a Play	Best Supporting Actress in a Play
Hammed Animashaun for A Midsummer Night's Dream; Charlie Cox for Betrayal; Hareet Deol for My Beautiful Laundrette; Giles Terera for Rosmersholm; Alexander Vlahos for Peter Pan	Sophie Thompson for Present Laughter; Monica Dolan for All About Eve; Isabella Pappas for Appropriate; Indira Varma for Present Laughter; Ria Zmitrowicz for The Doctor
Best Supporting Actor in a Musical	Best Supporting Actress in a Musical
Jack Loxton for Dear Evan Hansen; Oscar Conlon-Morrey for Only Fools and Horses The Musical; Jason Donovan for Joseph and the Amazing Technicolor Dreamcoat; Jordan Luke Gage for & Juliet; Joe Sugg for Waitress	Rachel Tucker for Come from Away; Laura Baldwin for Waitress; Cassidy Janson for & Juliet; Melanie La Barrie for & Juliet; Marisha Wallace for Waitress
Best Direction	Best Musical Direction
Jamie Lloyd for Evita; Marianne Elliott and Miranda Cromwell for Death of a Salesman; Robert Icke for The Doctor; Matthew Warchus for Lungs; Matthew Warchus for Present Laughter	Ian Eisendrath, Alan Berry and team for Come from Away; Kimberly Grigsby for The Light in the Piazza; Alex Parker for Mame; John Rigby for Joseph and the Amazing Technicolor Dreamcoat; Alan Williams for Evita
Best Choreography	Best Sound Design
Kelly Devine for Come from Away; Fabian Aloise for Evita; Matthew Bourne for Romeo & Juliet; Jennifer Weber for & Juliet; Nick Winston for Mame	Gareth Owen for Come from Away; Ben Harrison for Mame; Nick Lidster for Evita; Gareth Owen for & Juliet; Mick Potter for The Light in the Piazza
Best Set Design	Best Costume Design
Soutra Gilmour for & Juliet; Soutra Gilmour for Evita; Rob Howell for Present Laughter; Robert Jones for The Light in the Piazza; Rae Smith for The Night of the Iguana	Paloma Young for & Juliet; Lez Brotherston for Romeo & Juliet; Rob Howell for Present Laughter; Katrina Lindsay for Small Island; Philip Whitcomb for Mame
Best Lighting Design	Best Graphic Design
Howard Hudson for & Juliet; Jon Clark for Evita; Ben Cracknell for Joseph and the Amazing Technicolor Dreamcoat; Jessica Hung Han Yun for Equus; Tim Lutkin and Hugh Vanstone for Present Laughter	& Juliet (DeWynters); Captain Corelli's Mandolin (Muse Communication); Equus (Feast Creative); Evita (Feast Creative); Rosmersholm (Bob King Creative)
Best Video Design	
Andrzej Goulding for & Juliet; Jon Driscoll for Small Island; Will Duke for Grief Is the Thing with Feathers; P.J. McEvoy for Falsettos; Ewan Jones Morris for A Very Expensive Poison
Best Off-West End Production	Best Regional Production
Falsettos; Fiver; High Fidelity; Preludes; The View UpStairs	The Color Purple; Life of Pi; Mame; My Beautiful Laundrette; West Side Story
Radio 2 Audience Award for Best Musical
Six; The Book of Mormon; Everybody's Talking About Jamie; Hamilton; Les Misérables; The Lion King; Mamma Mia!; Matilda the Musical; The Phantom of the Opera; School of Rock; Tina; Thriller – Live; Wicked
Equity Award for Services to Theatre Society Special Award
Lizzie Berrington and Polly Kemp (ERA 50:50)

== Productions with multiple wins and nominations ==
=== Multiple wins ===
- 6 wins: & Juliet
- 5 wins: Come from Away
- 2 wins: Dear Evan Hansen, Falsettos, Present Laughter

=== Multiple nominations ===
- 13 nominations: & Juliet
- 8 nominations: Evita, Present Laughter
- 7 nominations: Mame, Waitress
- 5 nominations: Come from Away, Joseph and the Amazing Technicolor Dreamcoat
- 4 nominations: Betrayal, Death of a Salesman, Lungs, The Doctor
- 3 nominations: Dear Evan Hansen, Mary Poppins, My Beautiful Laundrette, Rosmersholm, The Light in the Piazza
- 2 nominations: Appropriate, A Midsummer Night's Dream, Equus, Falsettos, Life of Pi, Only Fools and Horses The Musical, Small Island, The Son
