= My Beautiful Laundrette =

1985 film by Stephen Frears

- Theatrical release poster
- Directed by: Stephen Frears
- Written by: Hanif Kureishi
- Produced by: Sarah Radclyffe; Tim Bevan
- Starring: Saeed Jaffrey; Roshan Seth; Daniel Day-Lewis; Gordon Warnecke; Shirley Anne Field
- Cinematography: Oliver Stapleton
- Edited by: Mick Audsley
- Music by: Stanley Myers; Hans Zimmer (Note: Stanley Myers and Hans Zimmer are collectively credited as Ludus Tonalis.)
- Production companies: Working Title Films; Channel Four Films
- Distributed by: Mainline Pictures
- Release dates: 7 September 1985 (TIFF); 16 November 1985 (United Kingdom)
- Running time: 97 minutes
- Country: United Kingdom
- Languages: English; Urdu
- Budget: £650,000
- Box office: $3 million

My Beautiful Laundrette is a 1985 British romantic comedy-drama film directed by Stephen Frears and written by Hanif Kureishi. It was one of the first films released by Working Title Films.

Set in London during the Thatcher years, the film reflects the fraught relationships between members of the Pakistani and English communities at that time. The story focuses on Omar (Gordon Warnecke), a British man of Pakistani origin, and his reunion and eventual romance with his childhood friend Johnny (Daniel Day-Lewis), now a street punk. The two become the caretakers and business managers of a launderette.

The British Film Institute ranked My Beautiful Laundrette as the 50th-greatest British film of the 20th century. It was adapted into a stage play in 2002 and 2019.

== Plot ==
Born in England, Omar Ali is a young Pakistani-British man living in South London during the mid-1980s. His father, Hussein, once a famous left-wing journalist in Pakistan, lives in London but dislikes Britain's society and its international politics. His dissatisfaction with the world and his wife's suicide have led him to sink into alcoholism, and Omar has become his caregiver. By contrast, Omar's paternal uncle Nasser is a successful entrepreneur and an active member of London's Pakistani community. Hussein asks Nasser to give Omar a job. He works for a brief time as a car washer in one of his uncle's garages, and then is assigned to manage a run-down laundrette.

At Nasser's, Omar meets a few other community members: Tania, Nasser's daughter and possibly a future bride (despite her being Omar's cousin); and Salim, who trafficks drugs and hires Omar to deliver them from the airport. While Omar is driving Salim and his wife home that night, the three are attacked by a group of right-wing extremist street punks. Their apparent leader turns out to be Johnny, Omar's childhood friend. Omar tries to re-establish their past friendship, offering Johnny a job and a chance for a better life by working with him to fix up the laundrette. Johnny accepts, and they resume a romantic relationship. Running out of money, Omar and Johnny sell one of Salim's drug deliveries to make cash for the laundrette's substantial renovation.

One night, Omar confronts Johnny about his right-wing past. Johnny says that although he cannot make up for that, he is with Omar now. Nasser visits the laundrette with his mistress, Rachel. As they dance together in the laundrette, Omar and Johnny have sex in the back room, narrowly escaping discovery. At the inauguration of the laundrette, Tania confronts Rachel about having an affair with her father. Rachel accuses Nasser of having invited Tania in order to have her insulted, and storms off despite his protests. Later that night, a drunk Omar proposes to his cousin Tania, who accepts on the condition that he raise money to get away. Soon afterwards, Salim reveals to Omar that he is aware of the two young men's relationship, and demands his money back from the drug sale. Omar's father stops by late in the night and appeals to Johnny to persuade Omar to go to college, because he is unhappy with his son's role.

Offering Salim a chance to invest in his businesses as a much-needed "clean outlet" for his money, Omar takes over two laundrettes owned by a friend of Nasser. Salim drives Johnny and Omar to view one of the properties, and he expresses his dislike of the British non-working punks in Johnny's gang. He attempts to run them over and injures one of them. Tania drops by the laundrette and tells Johnny she is leaving, asking him to come along. He refuses, implying the truth about his relationship with Omar, and she departs wordlessly. Rachel falls ill with a skin rash apparently caused by a ritual curse from Nasser's wife, and decides it is best for all that she and Nasser part ways.

After Salim arrives and enters the laundrette, the punks, who had been lying in wait, destroy his car. When he runs out, he is ambushed and viciously attacked. Johnny goes out to defend Salim, despite their mutual dislike, and the punks attack him in turn. Johnny refuses to fight back, and they beat him savagely until Omar returns and intervenes. He protects Johnny as the punks smash the window of the laundrette and flee.

Nasser visits Hussein, and the two fathers discuss their respective failures, agreeing between them that only Omar's future matters now. Nasser sees Tania at the train platform while she is running away, and he shouts to her, but she disappears. Meanwhile, at the laundrette, Omar tends to Johnny's wounds, and they playfully splash each other with water from a sink while shirtless.

== Cast ==
- Saeed Jaffrey as Nasser Ali
- Roshan Seth as Hussein "Papa" Ali
- Daniel Day-Lewis as Johnny Burfoot
- Gordon Warnecke as Omar Ali
- Derrick Branche as Salim N. Ali
- Shirley Anne Field as Rachel
- Richard Graham as Genghis
- Souad Faress as Cherry N. Ali
- Rita Wolf as Tania N. Ali
- Stephen Marcus as Moose

== Production ==
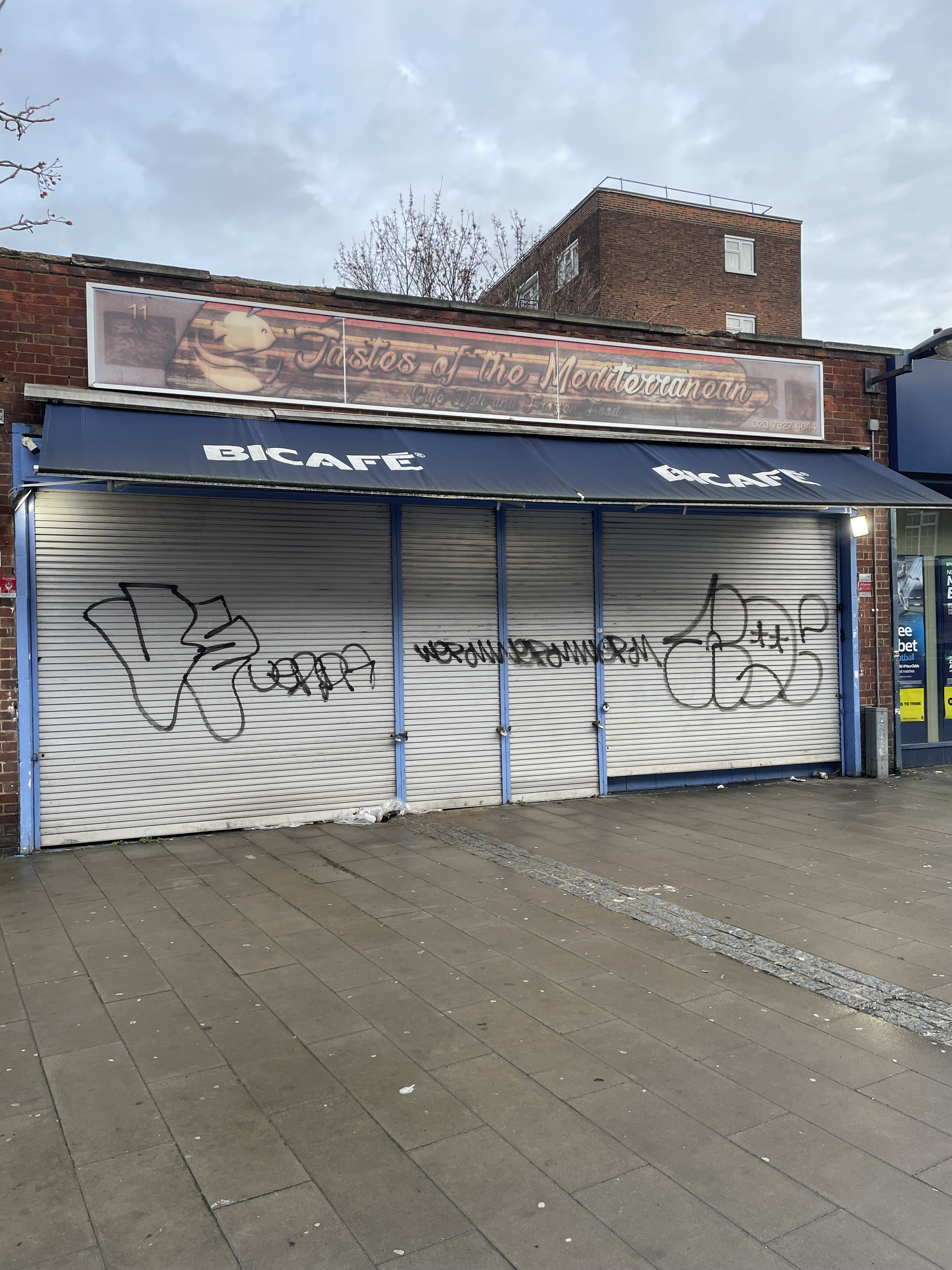
11 Wilcox Road, now demolished, was the site of the laundrette, in 2023

My Beautiful Laundrette was Frears's third feature film for the cinema. Originally shot in 16 mm for Channel 4 on a low budget, it was met with such critical acclaim at the Edinburgh Film Festival that it was distributed to cinemas. It eventually became an international success. The film was turned down by EMI Films under Verity Lambert.

The role of Johnny was originally offered to Gary Oldman, who turned it down after telling Frears he had issues with the script and the dialogue. Oldman and Frears worked together two years later on Prick Up Your Ears.

The film marked the first time Oliver Stapleton was in charge of cinematography in one of Frears's projects. He later became one of the director's consistent collaborators.

The film was shot around Wandsworth, Battersea and Vauxhall, all districts of South London. The location of the building which housed the laundrette on Wilcox Road, Vauxhall, was given a rainbow plaque in 2021.

=== Soundtrack ===
The original soundtrack, credited to Ludus Tonalis (a name associated with a work by composer Paul Hindemith), was produced by Stanley Myers and Hans Zimmer. Non-original music included the waltz Les Patineurs by French composer Emile Waldteufel and excerpts from Puccini's Madama Butterfly.

== Reception and accolades ==
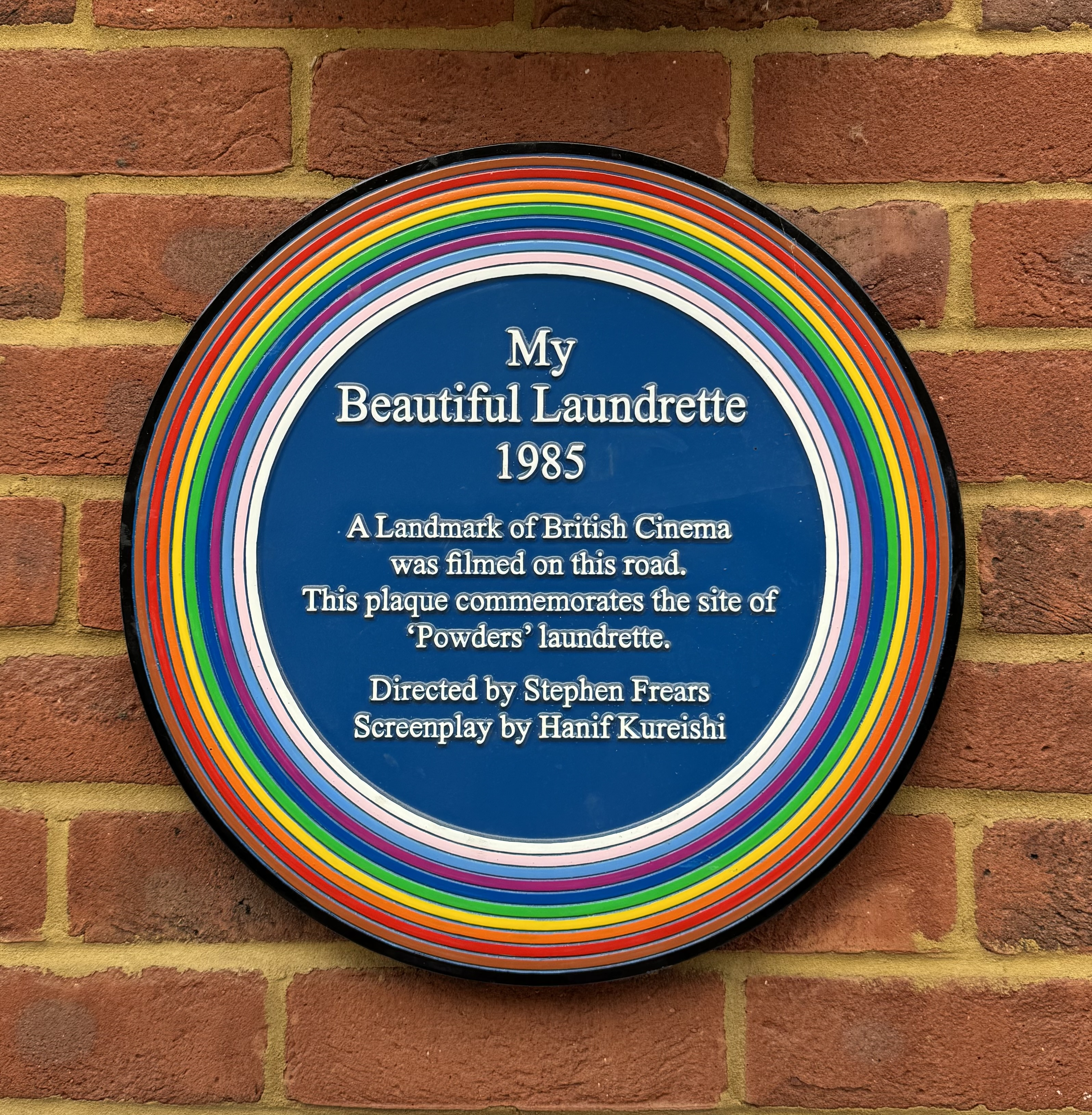
Newly reinstalled Rainbow Plaque, marking the site of the fictional "Powders" laundrette, in 2026

My Beautiful Laundrette received positive reviews, and was "scandalizing not only for its depictions of a gay romance but for its subversion of the Thatcherite rapaciousness sweeping the nation." On the review aggregator website Rotten Tomatoes, the film holds an approval rating of 95% based on 104 reviews, with an average rating of 7.9/10. The website's critics consensus reads: "My Beautiful Laundrette is fast and all over the place because it has so much to say, and show, including a highly watchable fresh-faced Daniel Day-Lewis." Metacritic, which uses a weighted average, assigned the film a score of 76 out of 100, based on 21 critics, indicating "generally favorable" reviews.

The film grossed $3 million worldwide, including $2.5 million in the United States and Canada. Hanif Kureishi was nominated for the Academy Award for Best Original Screenplay. He lost to Woody Allen (Hannah and Her Sisters). Kureishi was also nominated for the BAFTA in the same category. The screenplay received an award from the National Society of Film Critics. Daniel Day-Lewis received the award for Best Supporting Actor from the U.S. National Board of Review of Motion Pictures, and the picture was nominated for Best Film.

== Adaptations ==
In 2002, My Beautiful Laundrette was adapted into a play by Roger Parsley and Andy Graham from Snap Theatre Company, and was performed at British theatres in 2002. The music score, composed by Gaudi and Keita, was released on CD by Sub Signal Records.

Another play based on the film was adapted by Kureishi and produced in 2019 at theatres across England. It was a co-production among Leicester's Curve Theatre, Coventry's Belgrade Theatre, Cheltenham's Everyman Studio Theatre and Leeds Playhouse. Gordon Warnecke, who played Omar in the original film, played Omar's father in the adaptation. It was directed by Nikolai Foster and featured both back catalog and new music from the Pet Shop Boys.

In January 2018, Variety reported that Pakistani-American actor Kumail Nanjiani would write and star in an American serialized television version of My Beautiful Laundrette, based loosely on the original film. Hanif Kureishi, Stephen Gaghan, and Alec Berg were said to serve as executive producers.

== See also ==
- Cinema of the United Kingdom
- Independent cinema in the United Kingdom
- BFI Top 100 films
- London in film
- List of 1980s films based on actual events
- Pakistani community of London
