= Self-service laundry =

Customer-operated laundering

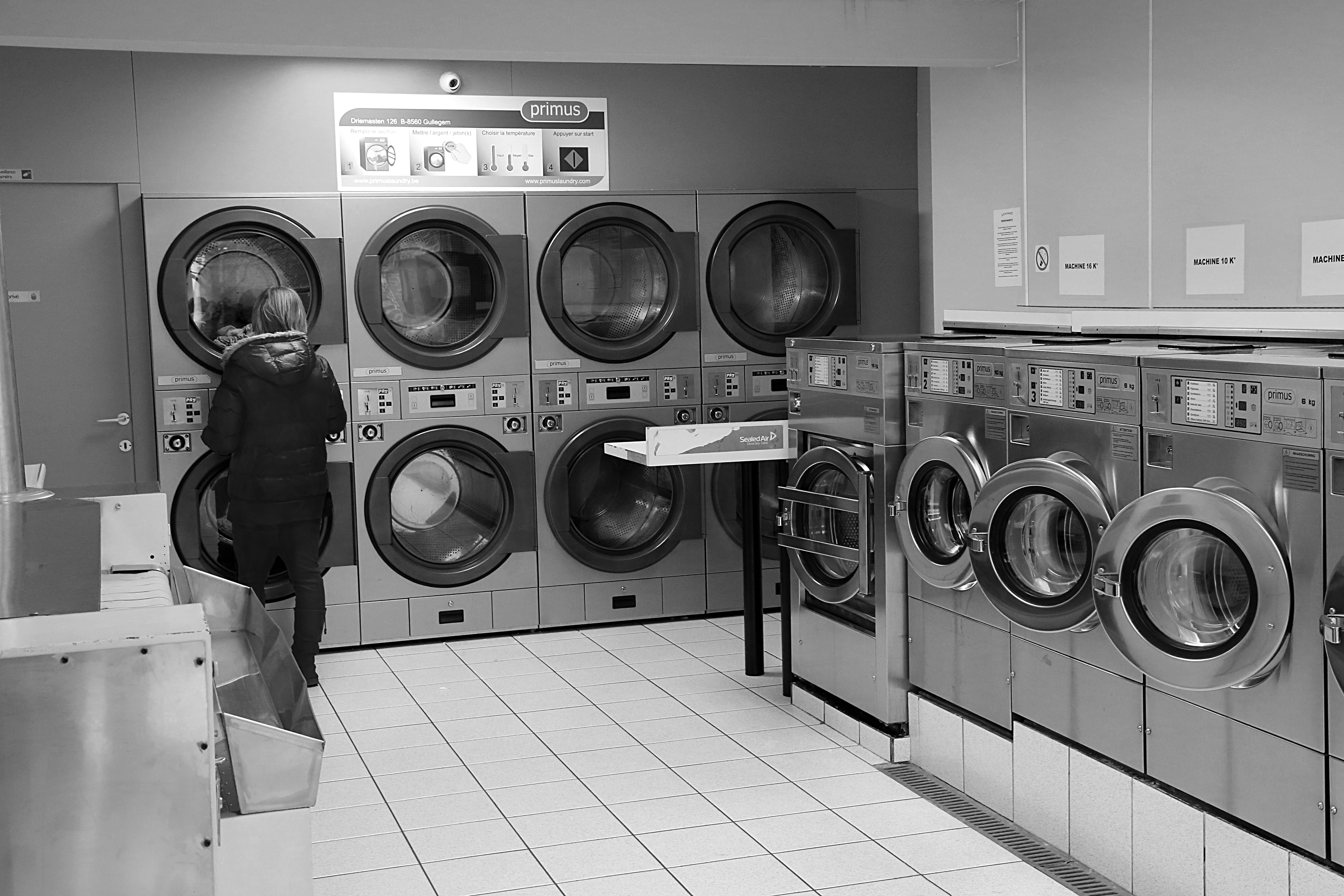
A customer using a tumble dryer in a self-service laundry in Mouscron, Belgium

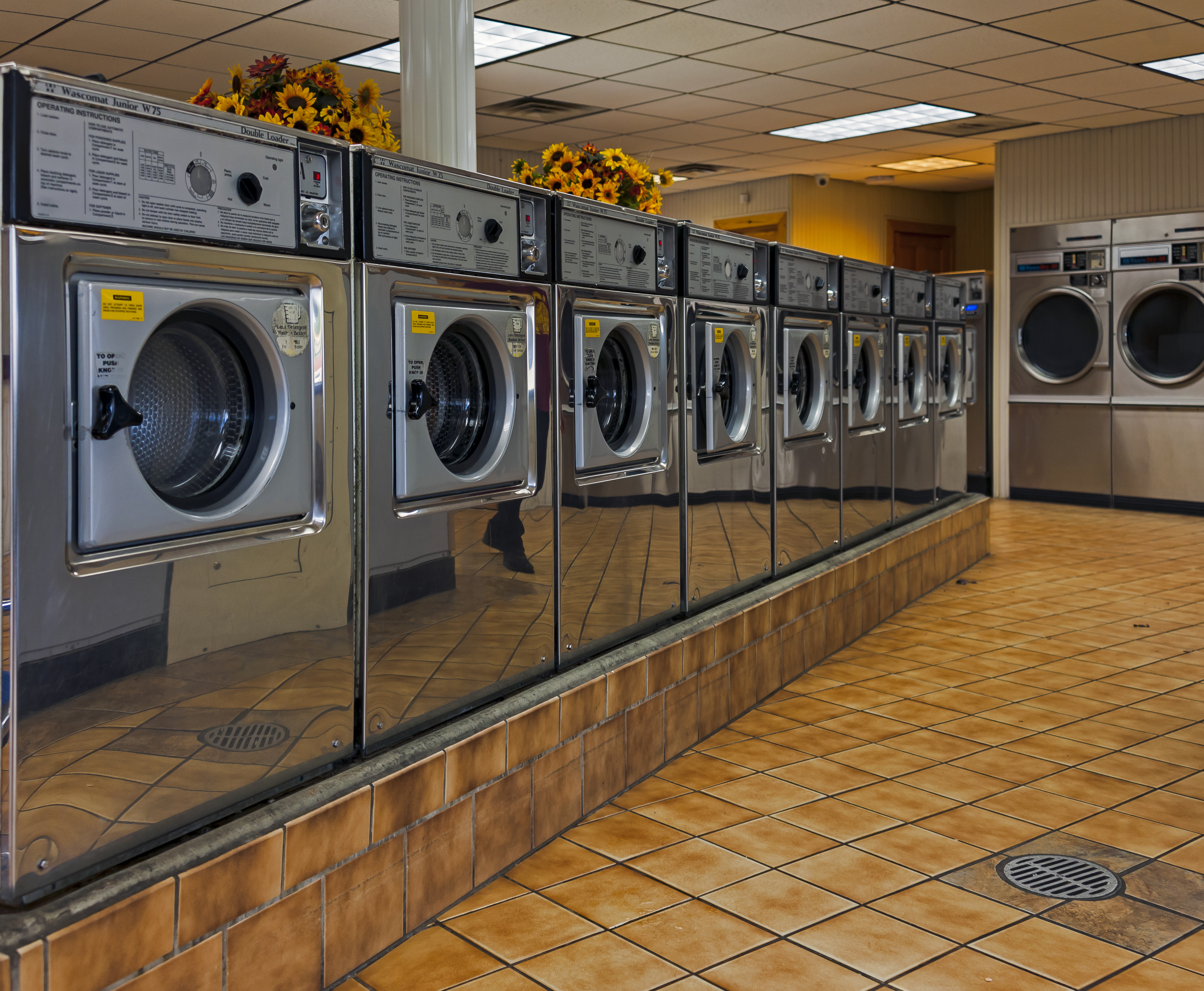
A row of washing machines at a self-service laundry in Walden, New York

Coin laundry in Kanagawa, Japan (2023)

A self-service laundry or coin laundry is a facility where clothes and some household textiles are washed and dried by the customer. They are also known as launderettes in the United Kingdom and as the genericized trademark laundromats in the United States, Canada, Australia, and New Zealand. In Texas and other parts of the south central United States, the term washateria is still used by some older speakers. The first laundromat opened on April 18, 1934, in Fort Worth, Texas.

While 85% of households in the United States have laundry machines, self-service laundries are used by people who do not have their own machines. Even those who have their own machines sometimes use them for large bedding and other items that cannot fit into residential washers and dryers. Some multifamily dwellings have self-service laundry facilities available for use by tenants.

== Staffed laundries ==
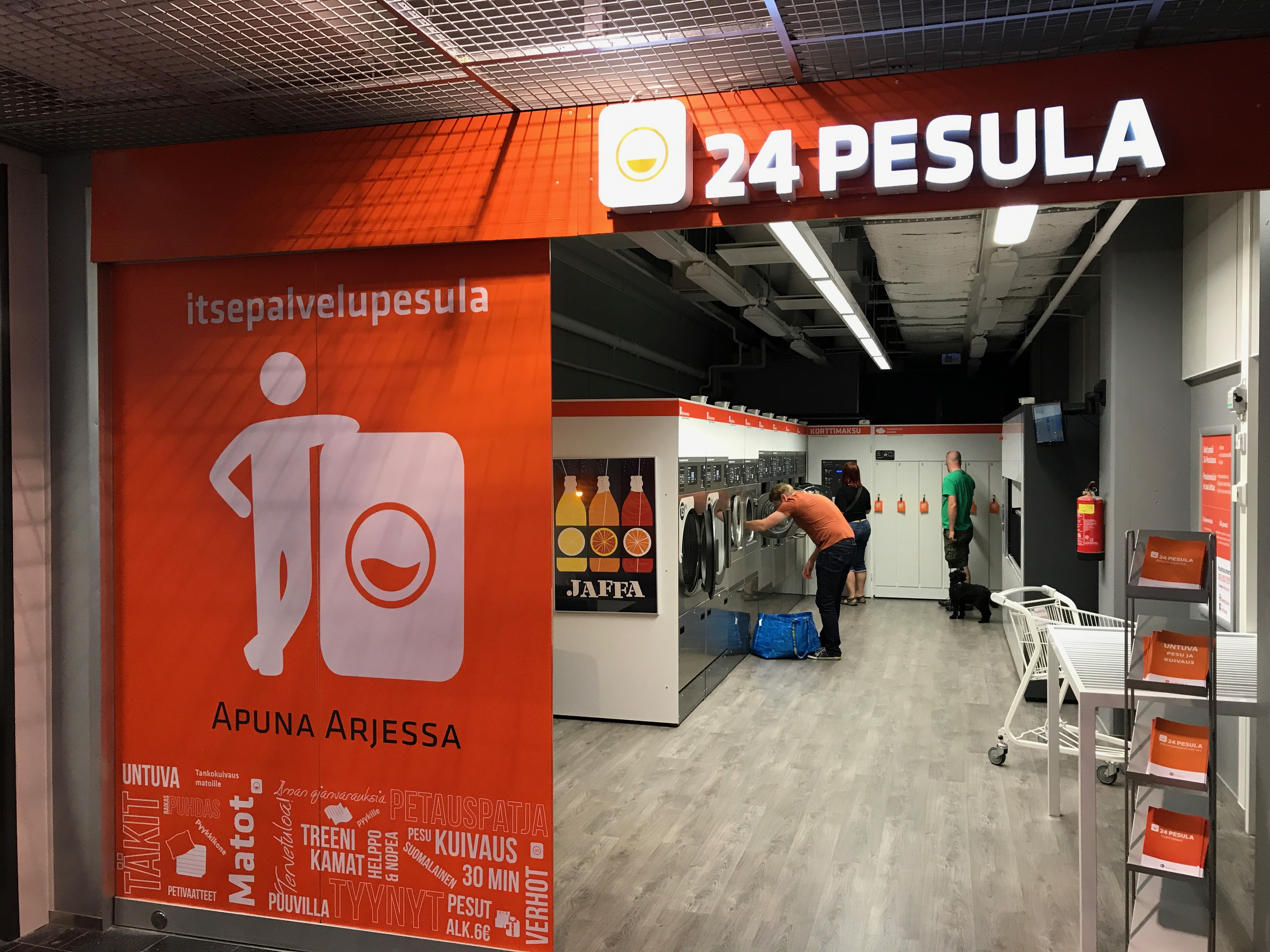
24 Pesula, a self-service laundry at the Ristikko Shopping Center in Konala, Helsinki, Finland

Self-service laundry are an essential business in urban communities. Self-service laundry owners may employ someone to oversee and maintain the general self-service laundry facility throughout the day. Some laundries employ staff to provide service for the customers. Minimal service centers may simply provide an attendant behind a counter to provide change, sell laundry detergent, and watch unattended washing machines for potential theft of clothing. If the business is big enough, the owner may employ a plumber to constantly maintain the machines and other workings.

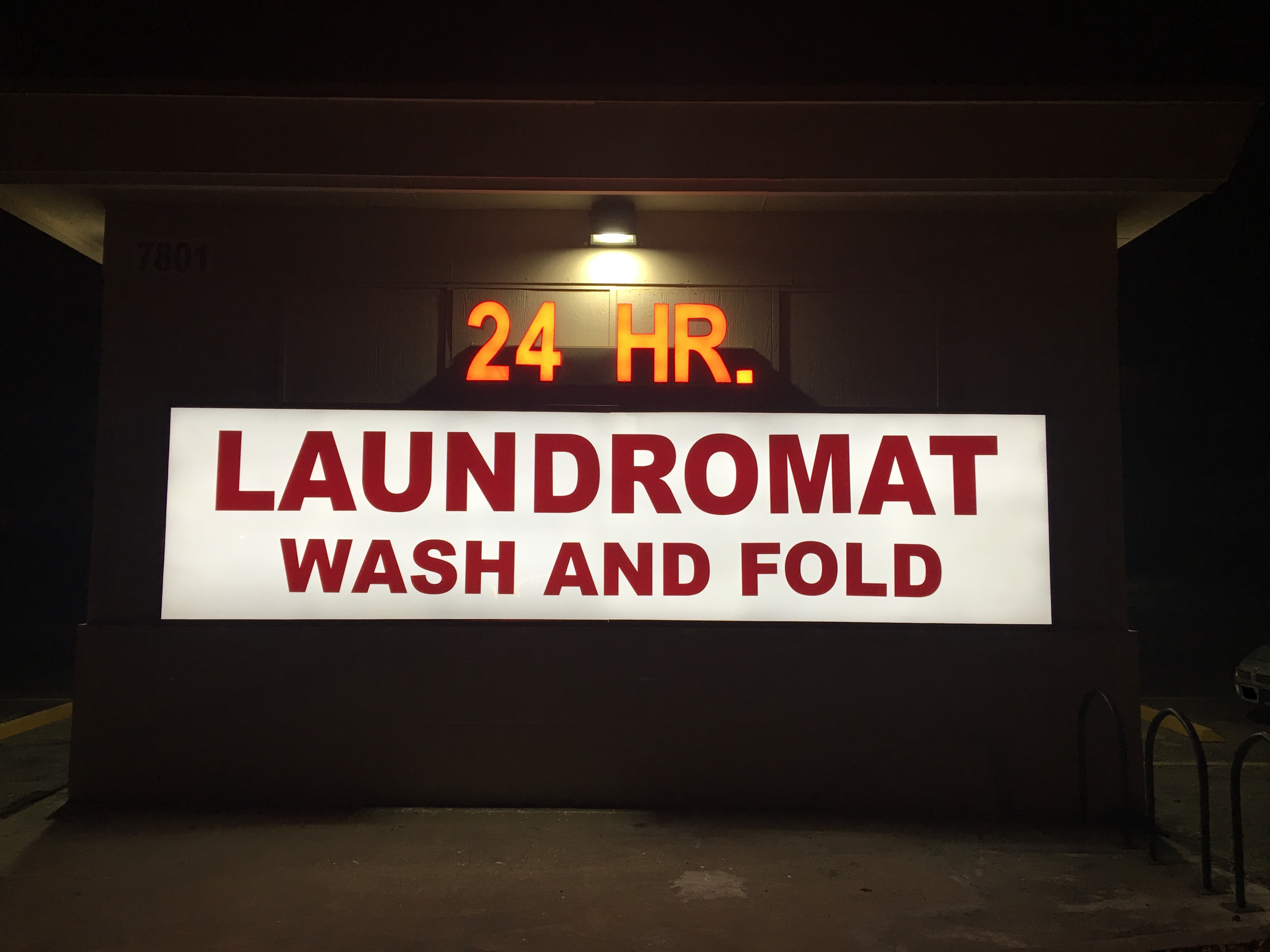
A laundromat sign in El Paso, Texas, which offers a wash and fold service

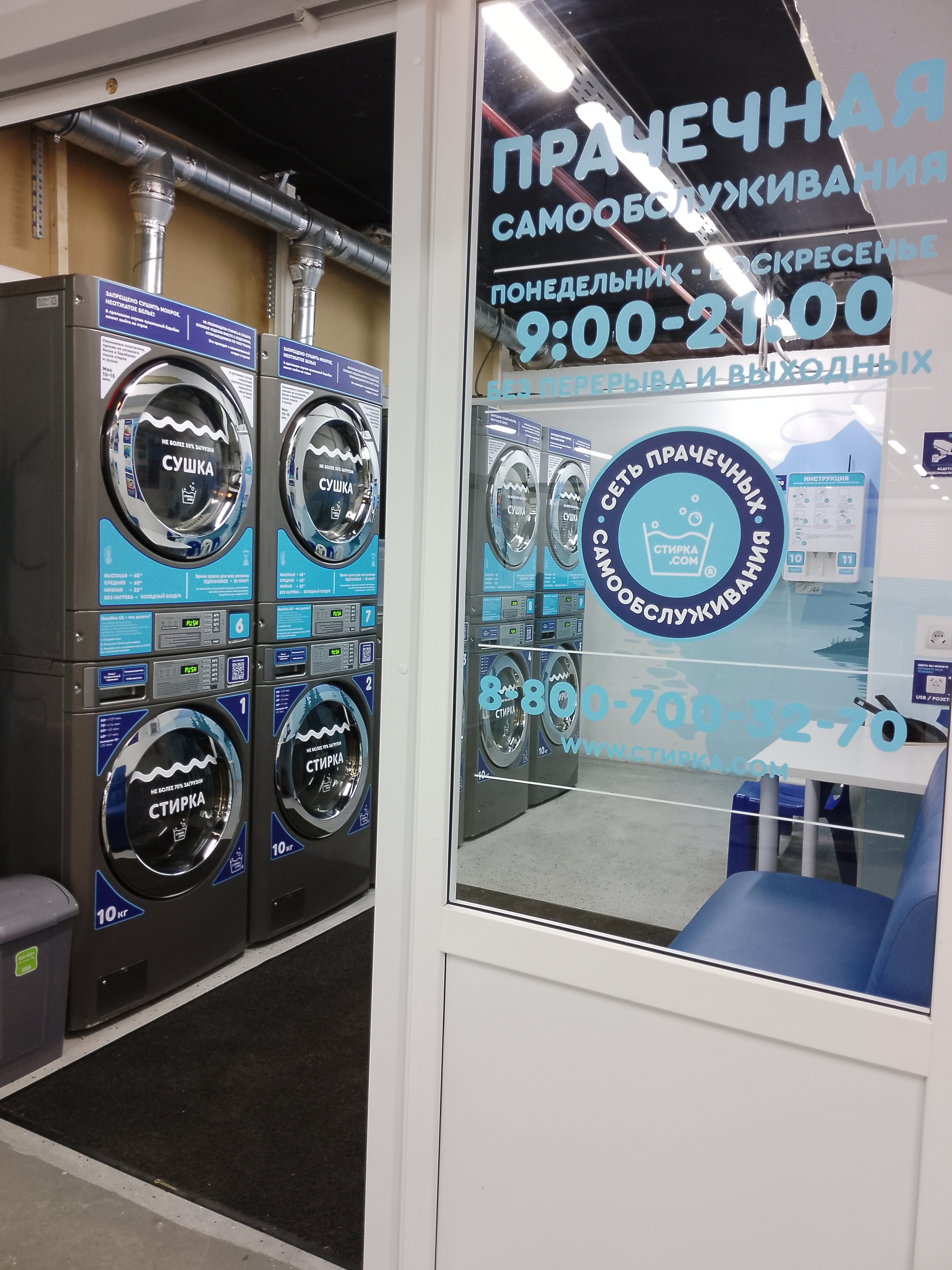
A self-service laundry in Moscow, Russia

Others allow customers to drop off clothing to be washed, dried, and folded. This is often referred to as fluff & fold, wash-n-fold, drop off, bachelor bundles, a service wash or full-service wash. Some staffed laundry facilities also provide dry cleaning pick-up and drop-off. There are over 35,000 laundries throughout the United States. Similar services exist in the United Kingdom where the terms service wash or full-service wash are also in use. The evolution of self-serve laundry services have been seen in some "fluff and fold" (also styled fluff n fold, fluff & fold, fluff 'n' fold, and fluff 'n fold) services provided by various laundromats. These services provide the end user with washing, drying, and folding services on a per pound basis, where the dry laundry is weighed before washing and services are billed on the basis of that weight. Some services offer free pickup and delivery, as well as complimentary laundry bags as part of their customer appreciation. Additionally, dry-cleaning services have been known to utilize the pickup and delivery as a means to help generate additional revenue.

== On-premise self-service laundry ==
On-premise self-service laundry are found in locations such as hotels, hospitals, student residences at universities, or apartment blocks. Facility managers/maintenance staff work directly with machine distributors to supply and maintain washers and dryers. Use of the machines are reserved for the residents of these facilities.

Many building owners use on-premise self-service laundry as a way to increase revenue. They can do this through renting their laundry room to laundry companies for a fixed monthly price allowing the laundry company to keep all revenue from the machines. Building owners also have the option to create a revenue sharing system where the apartment owner and laundry company split the profits from the machines each month.

== By country ==
=== Andorra ===
In Andorra, self-service laundries are widely available and in use by a good percentage of the population. Due to its cold weather, Andorra has a much larger percentage of dryer owners, as the cold weather does not allow for hanging laundry outside for most of the year, with the exception of a few months. The long Andorra winter sees a large usage of drying machines, also easily found in self-service laundries.

=== Australia ===
In Australia, self-service laundries are widely available and in use by a good percentage of the population. Due to its mild weather, Australia has a much smaller percentage of dryer owners, as the mild weather allows for hanging laundry outside for most of the year, with the exception of a few months. The brief Australian winter sees a surge in the usage of drying machines, usually easily found in self-service laundries.

=== Israel ===
In Israel, self-service laundries are available and popular mainly in Tel Aviv, where there is a large network of laundromats.

=== Portugal ===
Self-service laundries are present in Portugal.

=== New Zealand ===
In New Zealand self-service laundries (known locally as laundromats) are available, but not widely used. Historically, most houses in New Zealand have had their own laundry rooms for clothes washing. In recent decades the number of people living in smaller flats and apartments has increased, and so too has the availability and use of laundromats, especially in larger cities such as Auckland and Wellington.

=== Spain ===
In Spain, self-service laundries are available and popular. They are easy to find and operate.

=== United Kingdom ===
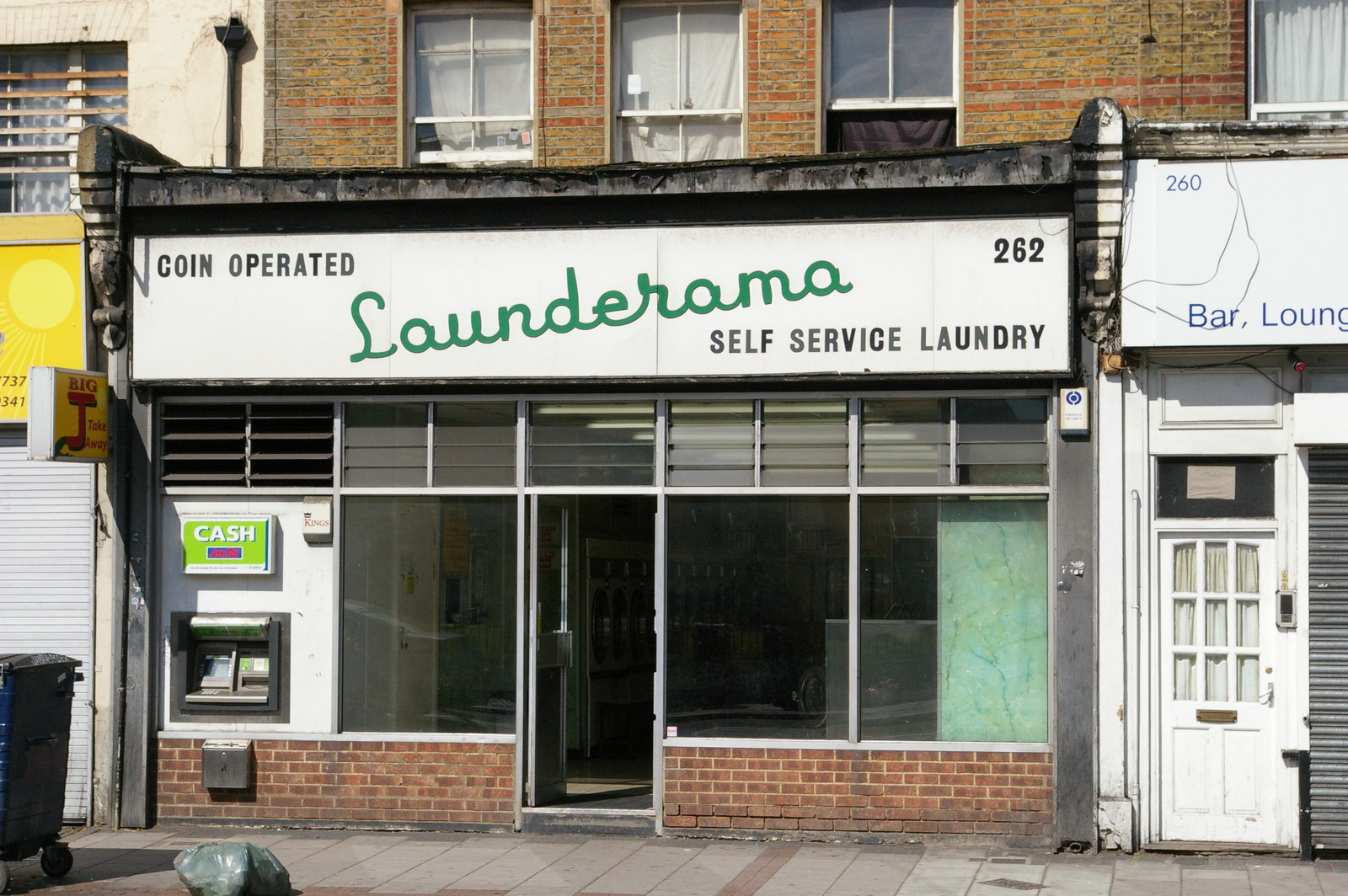
A launderette on Brixton Road

The first UK launderette (alternative spelling: laundrette) was opened on 9 May 1949 in Queensway, London. UK launderettes are mainly fully automated and coin operated, and are either fully staffed, staffed during certain hours, or unstaffed. They are generally found only in urban and suburban areas, where they have been common features since the 1960s.

From 1985 to 2010, the number of launderettes has declined, with only around 3000 remaining. Rapidly rising utility charges, premises rent and a lower purchase cost of domestic machines have been noted as principal reasons for the recent decline. High initial launch costs, specifically for commercial washing machines and dryers, have also been commented on as reasons for fewer new entrants into the market. Furthermore, machine updates can be prohibitively expensive, which has held back premises' investment.

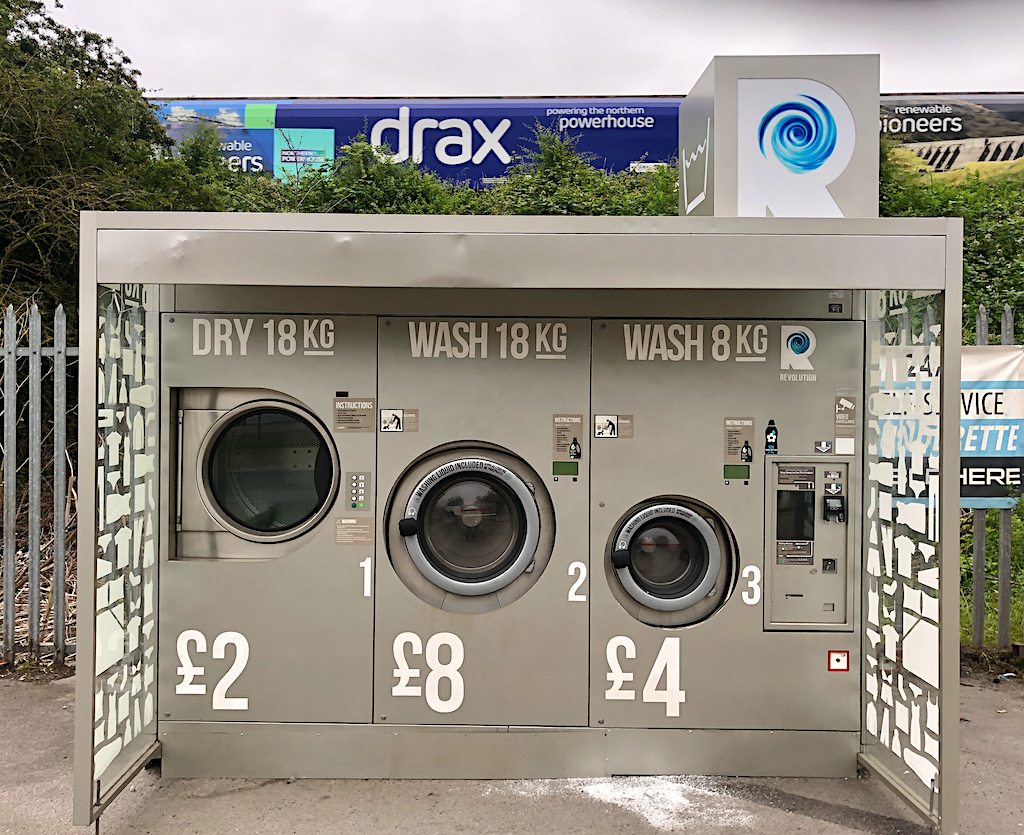
An open air launderette in Hull

Many of the staffed operations in the UK have added-value services such as ironing, dry cleaning and service washes, which are popular among professionals, students, and senior citizens. Student accommodation blocks often have their own unstaffed laundries, which are typically run at a profit by the accommodation provider.

Local phone directories only show laundries that pay to be included, so trends are difficult to assess. However, large cities such as Birmingham, Bristol, Leeds, Liverpool, London, Manchester, Sheffield and Southampton have significant numbers of launderettes, as do many coastal tourist areas.

The main manufacturers serving the UK in this market are Electrolux, IPSO, Maytag, and Primus. Brands such as Frigidaire and Speed Queen are also regularly deployed, with most originating from Belgium and the US.

=== United States ===
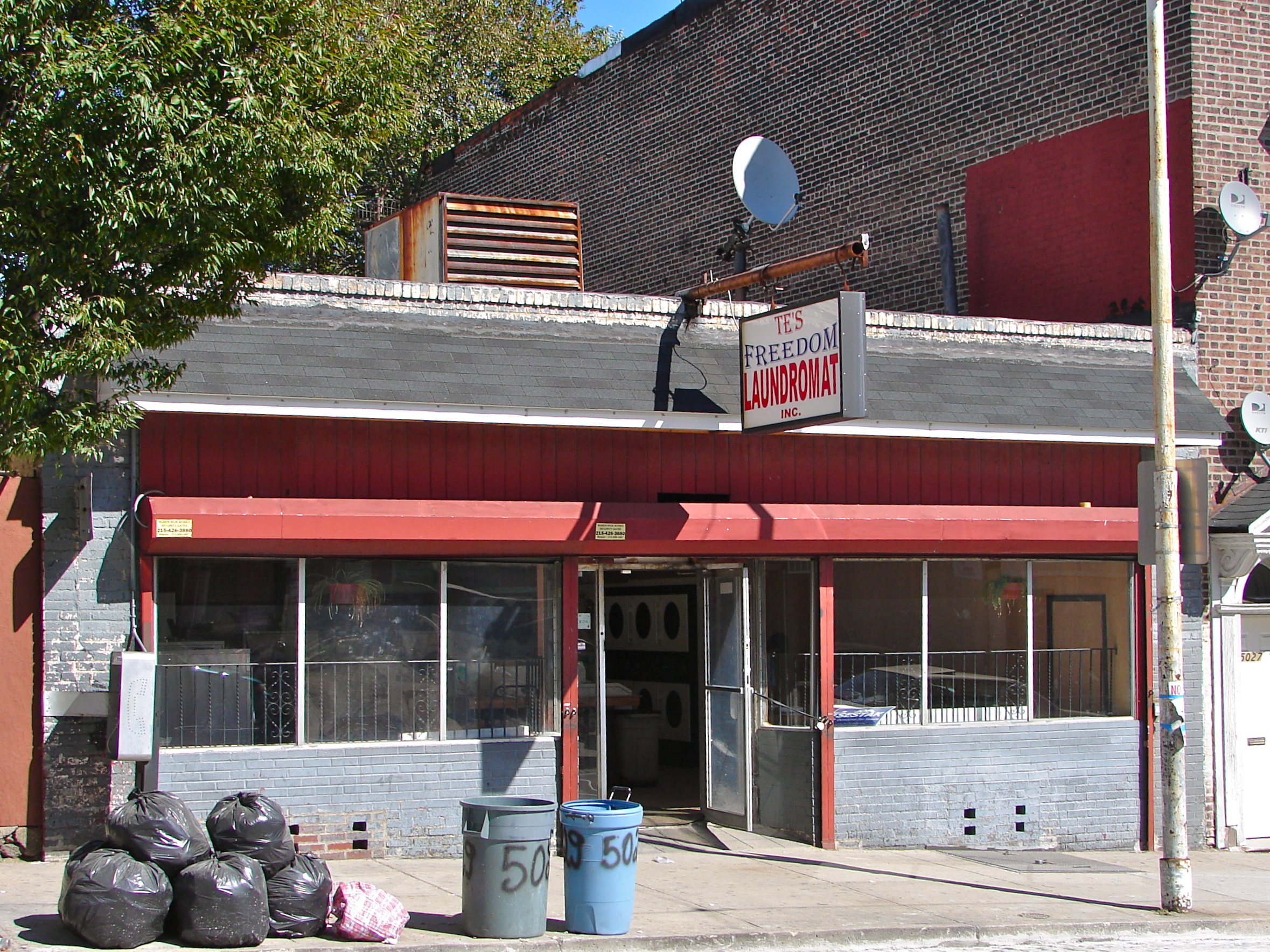
Laundromat in Philadelphia that opened in 1947 and is believed to be the first coin-operated laundromat in the United States

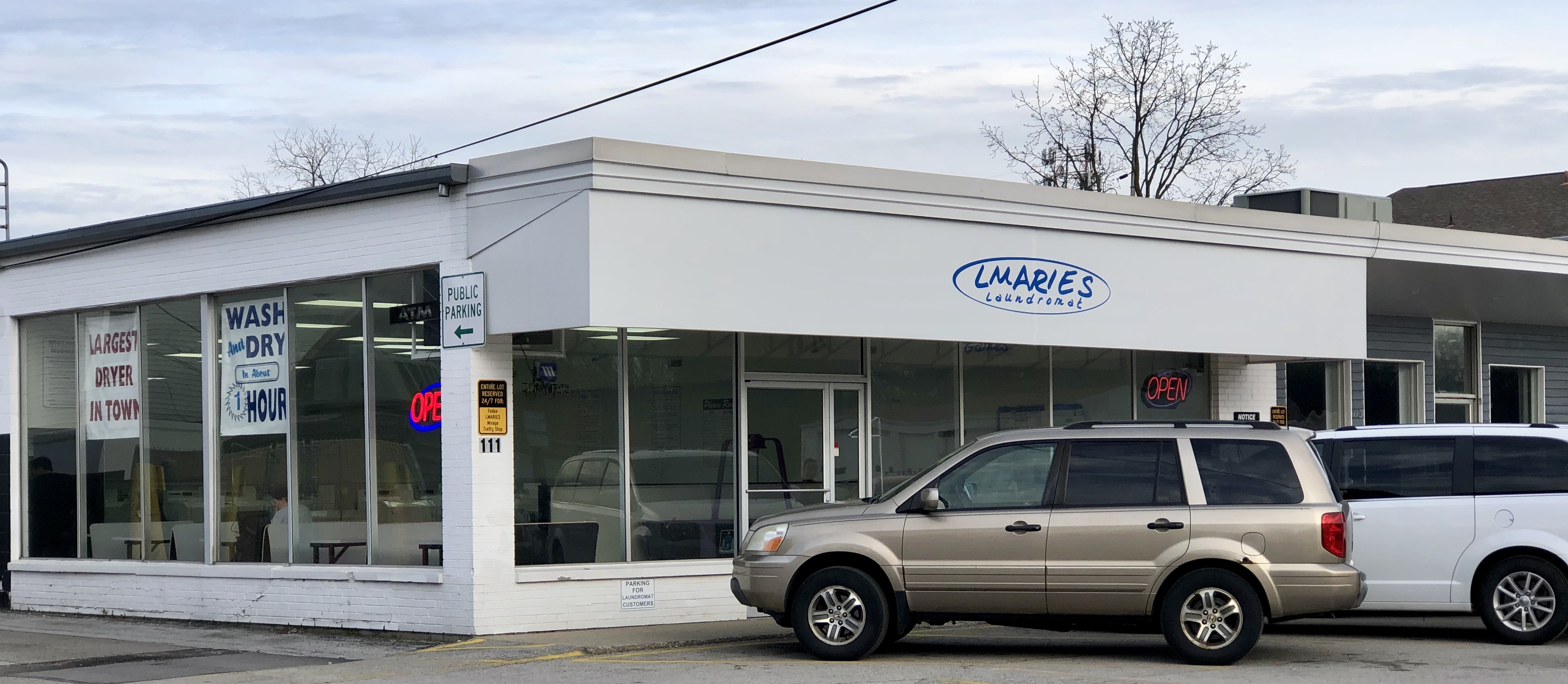
A modern laundromat in Ohio

Self-service laundry facilities in the United States are most commonly called laundromats. The term "laundromat" is the genericized trademark of the Westinghouse Electric Corporation, later White Consolidated Industries, and was created by its employee, George Edward Pendray. "Washateria" is an alternate name for laundromat, but is not in common use outside of Texas. The term comes from the first laundromat in the United States, which was known as a washateria and was opened on 18 April 1934 in Fort Worth, Texas, by C.A. Tannahill. Though steam-powered laundry machines were invented in the 19th century, their cost put them out of reach of many. Cantrell and others began renting short-term use of their machines. Most laundromats in the US are fully automated and coin-operated and generally unstaffed, with many operating 24 hours a day. The invention of the coin-operated laundry machine is ascribed to Harry Greenwald of New York who created Greenwald Industries in 1957; the company marketed the devices through the 20th century. While coin laundromats are very common, some laundromats accept credit cards or provide their own card system.

The United States Census Bureau estimates that there are 11,000 of this style of laundromat in the US, employing 39,000 people and generating over $3.4 billion every year.

== In popular culture ==
- My Beautiful Laundrette, 1985 film
- My Beautiful Laundrette, 2019 play adapted from the above film and written by the same individual who wrote the film's screenplay (Hanif Kureishi)

== See also ==
- Laundress or washerwoman, who used to do similar work
- Mangle (machine)
- Shared laundry rooms
