= Daniel Scott (actor) =

Daniel Scott was an Australian actor best known for his performance in the stage production of Priscilla Queen of the Desert - the Musical.

== Life ==
He was born and raised in Newcastle Upon Tyne and by age fourteen, he was an accomplished pianist and had appeared in productions of Oliver!, The Wizard of Oz, The Sound of Music, You're A Good Man Charlie Brown, Dick Whittington and His Cat and Desperado.

He studied at the McDonald College of Performing Arts, Australian Theatre For Young People and the National Institute of Dramatic Arts. He was also accepted into the American Conservatory Theater in San Francisco. He has received numerous scholarships from the likes of Sir Cameron Mackintosh and Nicole Kidman in association with ATYP and LendLease Australia.

Prior to Priscilla, he was mostly recognised from Dusty – The Original Pop Diva, based on the life of Dusty Springfield, where he created the roles of the "crazy Italian" San Remo, compere as well as Neil Tennant, Al Saxon and Eden Kane. In the Adelaide production of Shout! – The Musical, he performed the role of Johnny O'Keefe. He has also toured for the Really Useful Group in 2003/04 South Korean tour of Cats as the Rum Tum Tugger, also reprising the role in Athens in 2005.

Other theatre credits include Stephen Sondheim's Assassins; Mark Ravenhill's play Mother Clap's Molly House, La Cage aux Folles, Get Happy and What The World Needs Now. He has also performed three one-man shows – Give Us A Break, Ikonika and The Sweet and Low Down. His television and film credits include ABC's The Wizard of Solmar, Southern Star Group's Young Lions and Moulin Rouge!

He died suddenly in May 2014.

== Priscilla Queen of the Desert - the Musical ==
The role of Adam/Felicia, made famous in the film by Guy Pearce, was seen to promote Scott from company member to leading man status. Despite garnering good reviews for his performance, he has been injured on two occasions, causing him to leave the show temporarily as Nick Hardcastle took over the role.

Scott expressed to the press that playing the role of Adam/Felicia meant a lot to him: "Doing something like this, there are more messages that I can send with Adam other than he is just a cute young kid that is messed up. I can show a mirror of the good and the bad side of the community." With the role, and having come out at the age of 13, he felt a sense of responsibility to be a gay role model.
