= Polly Kemp =

British actress

- Born: 1963 or 1964
- Occupation: Actress

Polly Kemp (born 1963 or 1964) is a British television and theatre actor.

== Background ==
Kemp grew up in Keswick, Cumbria. Her mother was born in Lissarda, County Cork, Ireland. Kemp herself owned a house in Leap, County Cork for a period. Kemp moved to London when she was 18, where she became a nanny for her father's friends, Judi Dench and Michael Williams. Kemp graduated from Drama Centre London in 1988.

== Career ==
Kemp's theatre career includes productions with the Royal Shakespeare Company, The Old Vic, and the Hampstead Theatre. She is a member of The Pilgrim Players, a Shakespearean theatre group.

Her television credits include The Thick of It, Agatha Christie's Poirot, and Death in Paradise.

In 2011, Kemp was part of a group of celebrities on BBC Radio 3 Red Nose Show for Comic Relief which set a Guinness World Records title for the "largest kazoo ensemble".

In 2015, Kemp co-founded the 50:50 Equal Representation for Actresses (50:50 ERA) campaign with Elizabeth Berrington. In 2020, the co-founders won The Equity Award for Services to Theatre, presented at the 2020 WhatsOnStage Awards. Kemp also co-founded Her Story Productions, a programme to support female playwrights, based at the Jermyn Street Theatre.

== Personal life ==
In 2004, Kemp married fellow actor, Robert Whitelock.
