= Oliver Thornton =

British actor and singer (born 1979)

- Born: Oliver Rhoe Thornton; 10 September 1979 (age 47); Abergavenny, Monmouthshire, Wales
- Genres: Vocal, comedy, musical theatre
- Occupations: Stage actor, singer
- Website: www.oliverthornton.com

Oliver Rhoe Thornton (born 10 September 1979) is a Welsh stage actor and singer who is best known for his contributions to musical theatre in London's West End.

== Life and career ==
=== Early life ===
Thornton was born on 10 September 1979 in Abergavenny, Monmouthshire, Wales. Whilst at school, he discovered an interest in performing and studied classical ballet from an early age. He gained further acting experience with the Abergavenny Amateur Operatic Society (AAODS), which celebrated its 100th anniversary in 2011.

=== Training ===
Thornton began performing in South Wales, where he studied classical ballet, before completing a BA Honours degree in Musical Theatre from Mountview Academy of Theatre Arts.

=== Theatre ===
Thornton's stage credits include:

- Mark (Rent) – Duke of York's Theatre
- Raoul, Vicomte de Chagny (The Phantom of the Opera) – Her Majesty's Theatre
- Enjolras (Les Misérables) – Palace Theatre and Queen's Theatre
- Harrison (Chicago) – Adelphi Theatre
- Rusty the Steam Engine (Starlight Express) – UK tour
- CB the Red Caboose (Starlight Express) – Bochum, Germany
- Adam (Felicia) (Priscilla Queen of the Desert) – Palace Theatre
- Adam (Children of Eden) Gala Charity Concert – Prince Of Wales Theatre
- Frank N Furter (Richard O’Brien’s Rocky Horror Show) – UK tour
- Aladdin (Aladdin) – New Wimbledon Theatre
- King Arthur (Camelot) – Two River Theater, New Jersey
- Avi (Moses Man) – Alice Griffin Jewel Box Theatre, Off-Broadway
- Claude (Hair) – Wells Fargo Pavilion, Sacramento
- Bianca (Taming of the Shrew) – Shakespeare Theater Company, Washington, DC

Thornton has also sung with theatreland's first supergroup, Teatro (Sony BMG), during their live performances throughout England and Europe.

=== Filmography ===
- 2004 - De-Lovely as a member of chorus
- 2010 - Godforsaken as Leo
- 2016 - Blood Prose as Sebastian Arden (short film)
- 2017 - The Only Living Boy in New York as part of a gay couple
- 2018 - Madam Secretary, episode "The Magic Rake" as reporter #1

== Personal life ==
Thornton is openly gay.

== Awards and nominations ==
Year	Nominee / work	Award	Result
2010	Adam (Felicia) in Priscilla Queen of the Desert	Whatsonstage.com Theatregoers' Choice Award for "Best Supporting Actor in a Musical"	Won
2010	Adam (Felicia) in Priscilla Queen of the Desert	BroadwayWorld.com UK Award for "Best Featured Actor in a Musical"	Won
