= My Beautiful Laundrette (play) =

2019 play by Hanif Kureishi

- Written by: Hanif Kureishi
- Based on: My Beautiful Laundrette; Hanif Kureishi
- Music by: Neil Tennant; Chris Lowe
- Original language: English
- Setting: London

Premiere
- Date premiered: 20 September 2019
- Place premiered: Curve, Leicester

My Beautiful Laundrette is a play by Hanif Kureishi adapted from his screenplay for the 1985 film of the same name. The film was highly successful and became internationally known.

== Production history ==
The play premiered at the Curve in Leicester from 20 September to 5 October 2019 before touring to Everyman Theatre, Cheltenham (8 to 12 October), Leeds Playhouse (15 to 26 October), Belgrade Theatre, Coventry (29 October to 2 November) and Birmingham Repertory Theatre (5 to 9 November). The play was directed by Nikolai Foster and featured original music by Neil Tennant and Chris Lowe from Pet Shop Boys.

On 28 August 2020, Curve announced it would release an archive recording of the dress rehearsal of the production to play on its website from 2 September until the theatre could re-open, based on conditions of the COVID-19 pandemic. At that time major institutions were shut down.

The play returned to the Curve from 17 to 24 February 2024 before touring to Queen's Theatre Hornchurch (28 February to 9 March) and The Lowry, Salford (19 to 23 March).

== Cast and characters ==
Character	UK tour
Character	2019
Bilquis / Moose	Balvinder Sopal
Rachel / Cheery	Cathy Tyson
Papa / Zaki	Gordon Warnecke
Salim	Hareet Deol
Johnny	Jonny Fines
Nasser	Kammy Darweish
Tania	Nicole Jebeli
Omar	Omar Malik
Genghis / Dick O'Donnell	Paddy Daly
