= Pakistani community of London =

Total population
- 223,797; 2.7% of London's population (20% of the total Pakistani population in the UK)

Regions with significant populations
- London; Redbridge, Newham, Waltham Forest, Ealing, Brent, Hounslow, Croydon, Wandsworth, Merton, Hillingdon, Barking and Dagenham, Harrow

Languages
- English (British English, Pakistani English) · Punjabi · Urdu and others

Religion
- Islam 92% and Christianity 2%

Related ethnic groups
- Asian British people · Overseas Pakistanis · Pakistani people

The Pakistani community of London (also called Pakistani Londoners) consist of Pakistani emigrants and their descendants who have settled in London, the capital city of England and the United Kingdom. Pakistanis in London form the largest concentrated community of British Pakistanis; immigration from regions which now form Pakistan predate Pakistan's independence.

Pakistanis in London represent a diverse mixture of South Asian subgroups including Punjabis, Pashtuns, Muhajirs and smaller numbers of Sindhis and Balochis among others. A substantial number of British Pakistanis who arrived to London in the 1960s were qualified teachers, doctors and engineers.

== Demographics ==
Proportion stating that their ethnic group was Pakistani in the 2011 census in Greater London.

Pakistani Londoners are mostly Muslims who speak Urdu and Punjabi amongst other languages. The main concentrations of Pakistani settlement in London are found in Outer London with the boroughs of Redbridge, Newham and Waltham Forest accounting for nearly 40% of Londoners of Pakistani Descent.

Top 10 London Boroughs with largest population claiming Pakistani Descent as of 2021
Rank	Borough	Inner / Outer London	Population	Percentage
1	Redbridge	Outer London	44,000	14.20%
2	Newham	Inner London	31,216	8.90%
3	Waltham Forest	Outer London	28,740	10.30%
4	Hounslow	Outer London	17,454	6.10%
5	Ealing	Outer London	16,714	4.60%
6	Barking and Dagenham	Outer London	15,799	7.20%
7	Croydon	Outer London	15,345	3.90%
8	Brent	Outer London	15,217	4.50%
9	Hillingdon	Outer London	14,243	4.70%
10	Wandsworth	Inner London	12,249	3.70%
Inner and Outer London Totals
-	All Inner London Boroughs	Inner London	68,055	1.99%
-	All Outer London Boroughs	Outer London	222,494	4.05%
London Boroughs with population claiming Pakistani ethnicity of more than 2 percent
London Boroughs with population claiming Pakistani ethnicity of more than 2 percent
Source: Census 2011. Percentage indicates borough population of Pakistan descent

== Economics ==
The main industries which the Pakistani community of London are employed in include wholesale and retail (including self-owned grocery stores or newsagents). In 2001, 0.6% of businesses in London were owned by British Pakistanis. 20% of London's Pakistani population are self-employed.

The percentage of London Pakistanis employed in managerial, senior official or professional occupations is 25%, which is lower than the London average of 32%. However it is higher than the percentage of London Bangladeshis (22%) but lower than Indians (34%) and Other Asians communities (31%).

The unemployment rate for Pakistani males and females in London is lower than the national average British Pakistanis living in other regions of Britain. Pakistanis are the only ethnic group (along with White Britons) who have a lower worklessness rate in London than in other areas of Britain.

== Social class ==
As of 2001, almost equal amounts of Pakistanis in Inner (45%) and Outer London (46%) were middle class.

Middle class by Borough

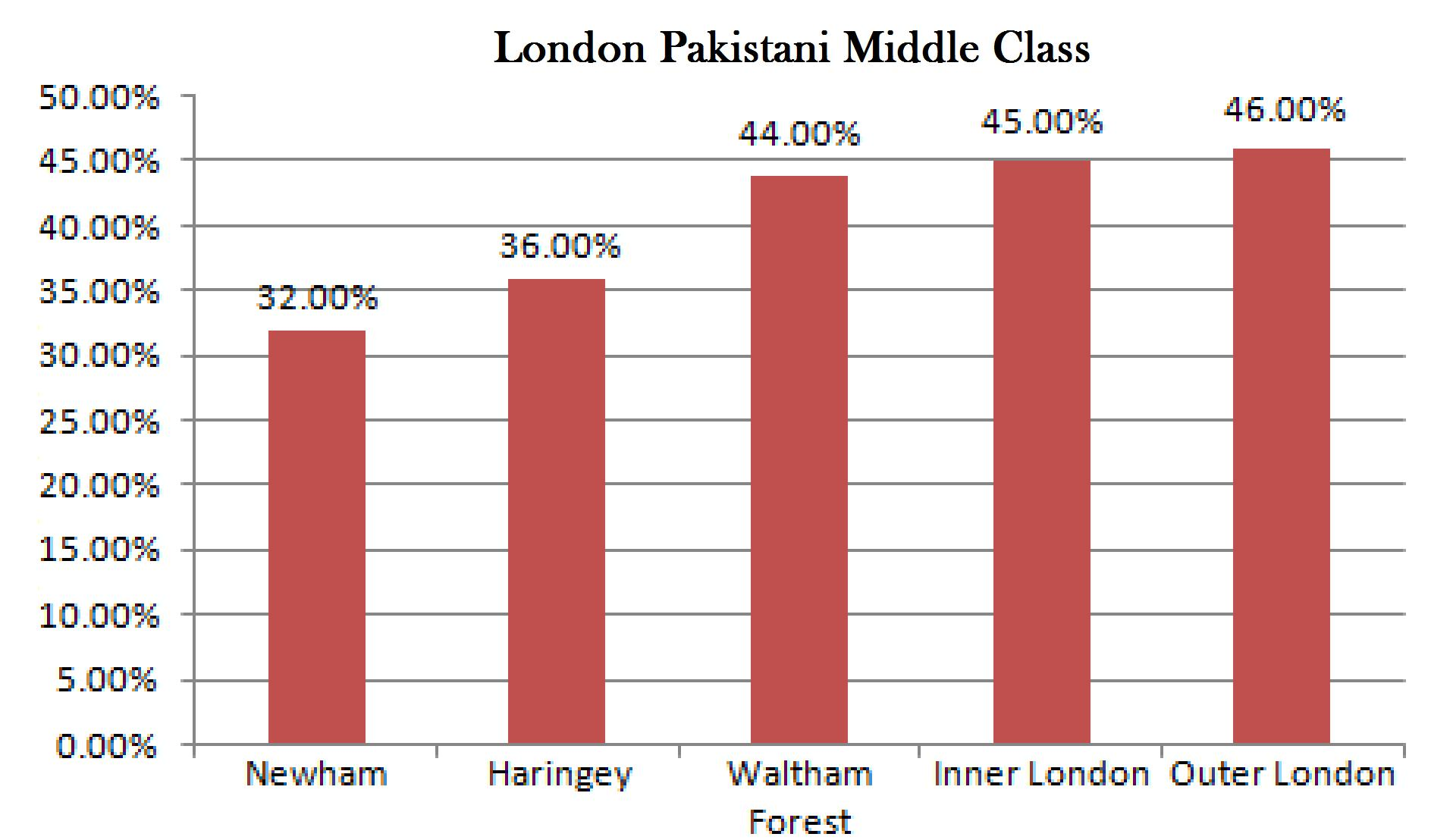
London Pakistani middle class

Borough	Pakistani middle class	Overall middle class
Waltham Forest	44%	N/A
Haringey	36%	N/A
Newham	32%	37%

Between 1991 and 2001, out of the total growth in the London Pakistani population, 52.7% of the growth was in the middle classes.

Growth in the middle class as a proportion of all growth

Region	Growth
England & Wales	36.4%
South East	39.6%
Greater London	52.7%
Outer London	52.6%
Inner London	52.8%

Growth in managers and professionals as a proportion was 22.8% between 1991 and 2001.

Growth in managers and professionals as a proportion of all growth

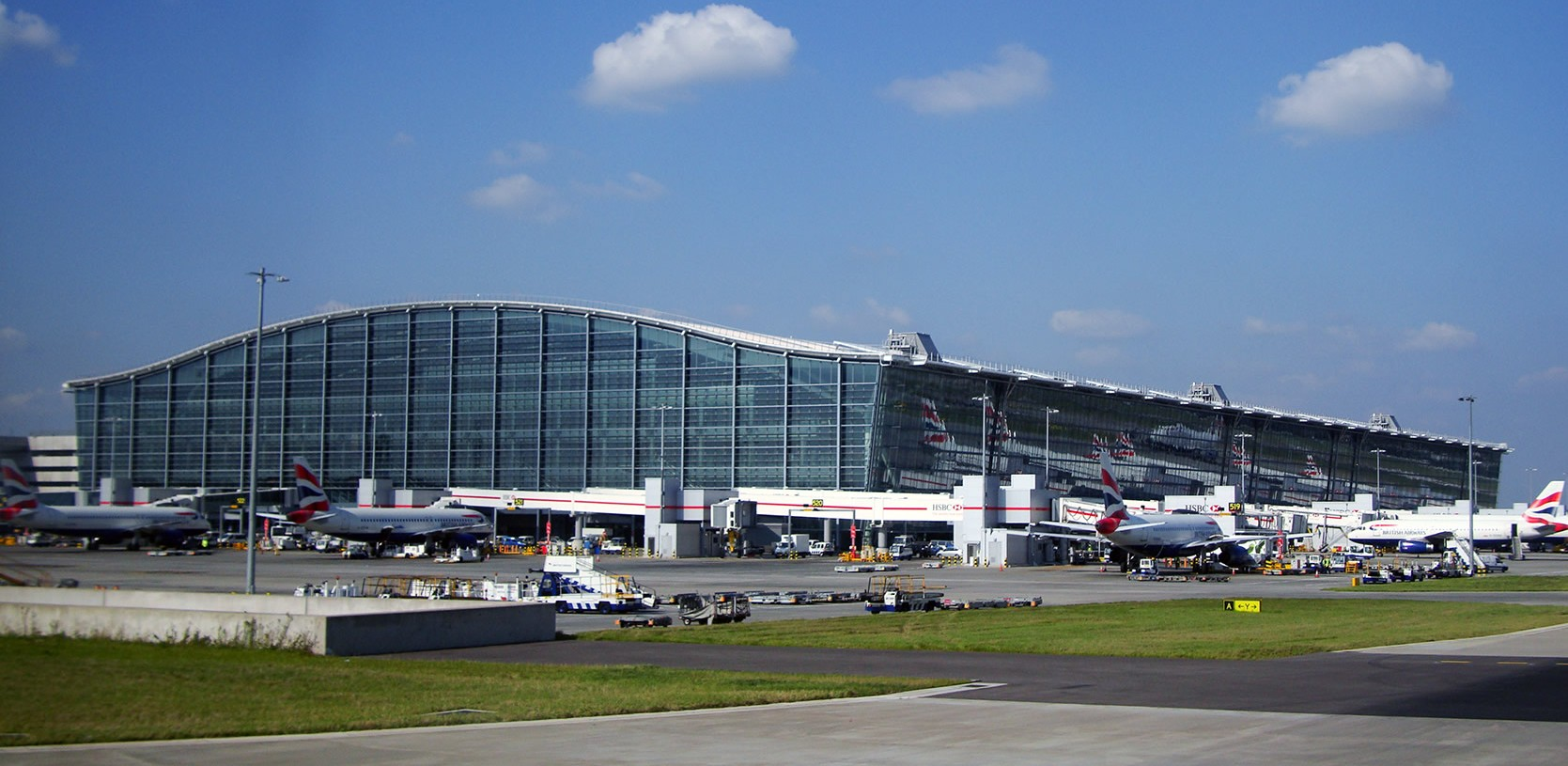
Sadiq Khan grew up close to Heathrow Airport

Region	Growth
England & Wales	15.8%
South East	18%
Greater London	22.8%
Outer London	22.6%
Inner London	23.5%

There are stark social differences in Pakistanis living in different boroughs of London. Whilst in Brent and Harrow London Pakistanis are fairly prosperous and mostly Middle Class. The opposite is true in Newham, where they are mostly working class and more likely to suffer from deprivation.

Several upper class Pakistanis also live in London, sometimes only for part of the year. The former Prime Minister of Pakistan Nawaz Sharif and former President and Chief of Army Staff Pervez Musharraf currently reside in London.

== Education ==
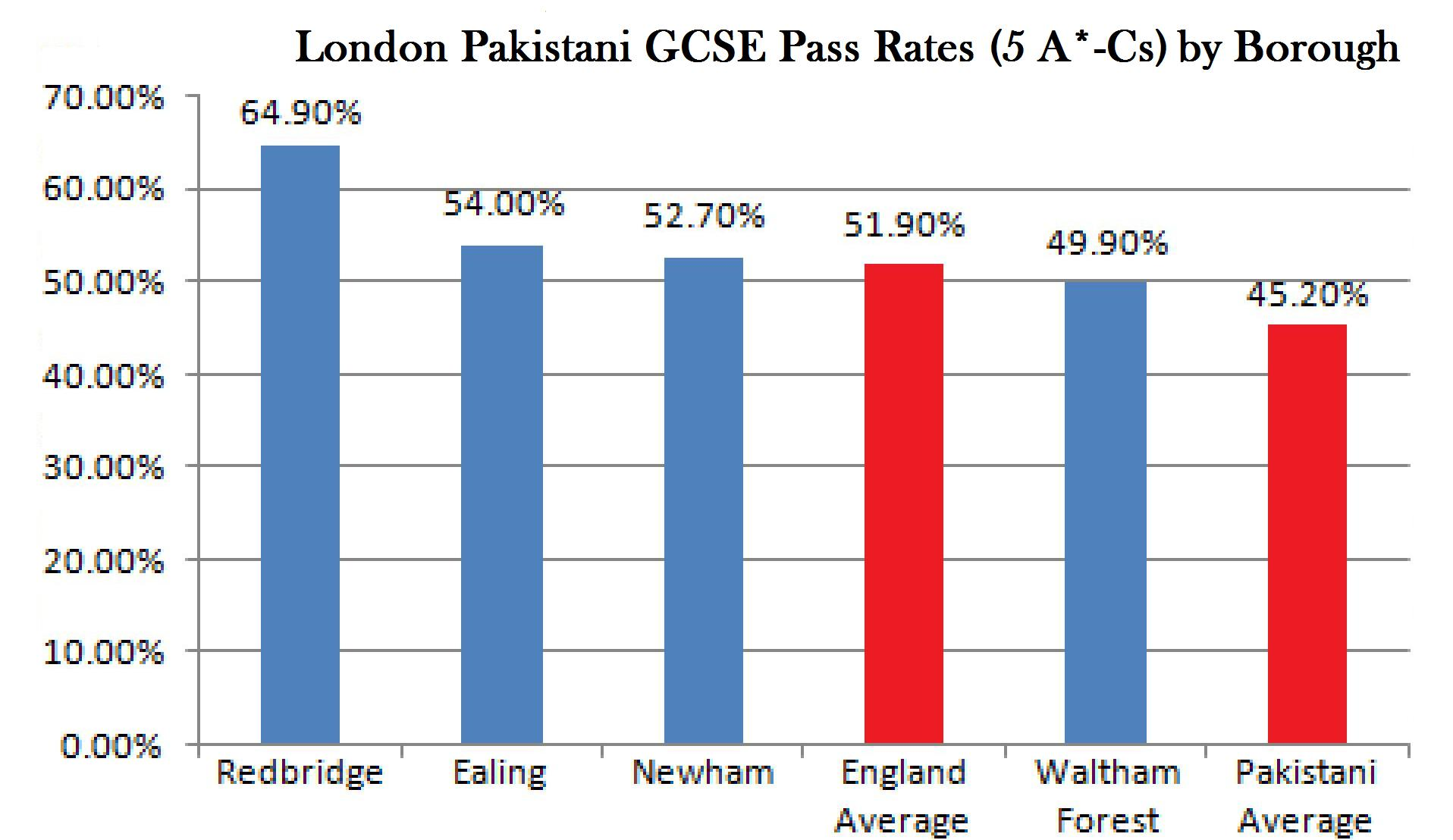
London Pakistani GCSE Pass Rates by Borough

Degree Level Qualifications

Key Stage 2

Latest figures available, regarding London Pakistanis, by local authority, dated: year 2004. At Key Stage 2 Pakistani children in London have higher attainment rates in both English and Maths, when compared with the British Pakistani average.

GCSEs

In contrast to Pakistanis from other regions of Britain. Pakistanis in London achieve above average GCSE Pass Rates. For example, in 2004, 50.2% of London Pakistani boys achieved five or more A*-C grades, compared with the national average of 46.8%. Furthermore, 63.3% of Pakistani girls in London reached that threshold compared to the national average of 57%.

The achievement of Pakistanis in London at GCSE level is 10 percentage points higher than that of Pakistanis throughout England. The highest attainment within London was found in the borough of Redbridge.

Degree Level Qualifications

Pakistani applicants to universities are over-represented by 7.5% from Greater London. In education, Pakistanis in London performed the highest out of all British Pakistanis in the 2001 census. This is not just reflected in above average GCSE pass rates but also in degree level qualifications, with 32% of London Pakistanis having degree level or higher qualifications. This is marginally higher than the London average of 31% and is more than twice as high as the figure for London Bangladeshis (15%), equal to the figure for "Other Asians" and comparable to the figure of 34% for London Indians. Pakistanis in Inner London do slightly better than those in Outer London, with 33% reaching the benchmark compared to 32% in Outer London. The figure is higher than the national average of 20% and almost twice as high as the figure for Pakistanis throughout the UK (18%).

Pakistani men are better qualified than the average Londoner, with 37% possessing a degree level or higher qualification, although Pakistani women have fewer educational qualifications, with 27% having the same qualifications. The figure for Pakistani women in London is still higher than the national or British Pakistani national average.

== Religion ==
In similarity to Pakistanis living in other parts of the UK, 91% of Pakistanis in London are Muslims. The other 6% are made up of people who did not declare their religion; Christians made up 2% and those with no religion made up 1%. Pakistanis make up only 22% of London's Muslim population, in contrast to 43% for British Pakistanis living throughout the UK.

== Notable Londoners of Pakistani origin ==
- Sajid Javid - is a British Pakistani politician of the Conservative Party and former managing director at Deutsche Bank. He was appointed Home Secretary in April 2018, the first Asian and the first from a Muslim background to hold one of the Great Offices of State.
- Nazir Ahmed, Baron Ahmed (born 1957) - member of the British House of Lords
- Riz Ahmed - also known as Riz MC; British Pakistani actor and rapper from Wembley, London; lead performances in The Road to Guantanamo, Shifty, Britz, Four Lions, The Reluctant Fundamentalist and "Rogue One: A Star Wars Story"
- Tariq Ali - British Pakistani historian, novelist, journalist, filmmaker, public intellectual, political campaigner, activist, and commentator
- James Caan (born Nazim Khan) - British Pakistani entrepreneur and television personality, best known as a former investor on the BBC programme Dragons' Den
- Anjem Choudary - British Pakistani radical and former head of Islam4UK, which was proscribed by the UK Government in 2010
- Altaf Hussain - British Pakistani politician and fugitive, wanted terrorist in Pakistan; one of the founders and for many years lead the Karachi based Muttahida Qaumi Movement
- Hamzah Sheeraz - British professional boxer who has held the WBO European light-middleweight title since 2019.
- Hasnat Khan - British Pakistani heart and lung surgeon identified as an "ex-lover" of Diana, Princess of Wales, who is said to have described him as "Mr Wonderful"
- Sadiq Khan - British Pakistani Labour Party politician; has been the Mayor of London since 2016. Previously, he was the Member of Parliament (MP) for Tooting since 2005, succeeding Tom Cox as the Labour MP for the seat
- Hanif Kureishi - playwright, screenwriter, filmmaker, novelist and short story writer
- Mazhar Majeed - British Pakistani sporting agent and bookmaker; arrested by Scotland Yard for allegedly fixing a Test match between England and Pakistan at Lord's
- Sir Anwar Pervez - Pakistan-born businessman; estimated by The Times to be Britain's richest Muslim in 2010; founder of the Bestway Group
- Owais Shah - cricketer who plays for Middlesex and has appeared for England in a number of One Day Internationals and test matches

== See also ==
- Pakistan – United Kingdom relations
- List of British Asian people
- British Asian
- British Pakistani
- List of British people of Pakistani descent
- Indo-Canadians in the Greater Toronto Area
- History of the Pakistani Americans in Houston
