= Gordon Warnecke =

British actor (born 1962)

- Born: 24 August 1962 (age 63); London, England, UK
- Occupation: Actor
- Years active: 1985–present

Gordon Warnecke (born 24 August 1962 in London) is a British actor of German and Indo-Guyanese parentage. He is known for his role as Omar in the 1985 film My Beautiful Laundrette, co-starring as the lover of Johnny (Daniel Day-Lewis). Other film credits include Franco Zeffirelli's Young Toscanini and Hanif Kureishi's London Kills Me.

Television credits include Boon, Doctor Who (in the serial The Trial of a Time Lord), Only Fools and Horses, Virtual Murder, Birds of a Feather, EastEnders, Holby City and The Bill.

An experienced theatre actor, he has performed with the Royal Shakespeare Company and the Royal Court Theatre; he most recently returned to the stage with a national tour of Ibsen's An Enemy of the People for Tara Arts and two new contemporary adaptations of Christmas productions at the Trinity Theatre in Tunbridge Wells, Kent. He has written and directed a short film The Magician, which was due to be released in March 2012. He also appeared in an episode of Holby City in March 2017.

Since 2014, he has been actor-in-residence at East Barnet School in North London, providing workshops and masterclasses to pupils.

== Film ==
Year	Title	Role	Notes
1985	My Beautiful Laundrette	Omar	
2017	Venus	Papaji	
2018	London Unplugged	Da'nish's Dad	Anthology film

== Television ==
Year	Title	Role	Notes
1986	Boon	Hanif Kurtha	10 episodes
1986	Doctor Who	Tuza	Serial: "Mindwarp"
1987	Bureaucracy of Love	Zaffir Khan	TV film
1989	Birds of a Feather	Ranjith	2 episodes
1990	EastEnders	Jabbar	10 episodes
1990	Only Fools and Horses	Henry	Episode: "The Sky's the Limit"
1992	A Fatal Inversion	Shiva Manjusri	3 episodes
1992–2001	The Bill	Various	5 episodes
1995	Brookside	Dil Palmar	20 episodes
2002	NCS: Manhunt	Jimmy Patel	Episode: "Tinderbox: Part 2"
2014	Puppy Love	Ravi Singh	3 episodes
2017	Holby City	George Ridgeley	Episode: "Unbreakable"
