= Ben Harrison (sound designer) =

British sound designer

Ben Harrison is a British sound designer specialising in musical theatre and live events.

== Career ==
Between 2002 and 2007 Harrison was head of sound at Leicester Haymarket Theatre where he designed sound for productions of West Side Story; The Lion, The Witch and the Wardrobe; Hot Stuff - the Christmas Edition; Macbeth; An Illustrious Corpse; Beautiful Thing; The Fortune Club; East; Divine; The Bogus Woman (which production later traveled to Adelaide & New York); The Good Woman of Schezuan; Steven Sondheim's Pacific Overtures; The Happy Prince; and The Wizard of Oz.

Harrison designed the Laurence Olivier Award-winning production of Cabaret at the Lyric Theatre in London in 2007.

Harrison also designed with Will Young the sound for the Cabaret production at the Savoy Theatre in 2012 and at the King's Theatre in Edinburgh in 2013. Other West End projects he worked on include Dreamboats and Petticoats with Des O’Connor and Tony Christie, Scrooge at the London Palladium with Tommy Steele, The Country Girl at the Apollo Theatre with Jenny Seagrove and Martin Shaw, Soul Sister and Dancing in the Streets.

Harrison toured the United Kingdom and internationally with Olivier and the Tony Awards-nominated Blood Brothers, Starlight Express, Tommy, Dr Dolittle, Laughter In The Rain, Jekyll & Hyde, Whistle Down The Wind (UK & American tours), Fame the Musical (Cyprus & Monte Carlo), Dancing in the Streets (International tour), Cabaret, Dreamboats & Petticoats, The Country Girl, Evita (International Tour) and Soul Sister (Hackney Empire, West End and UK Tour).

Productions for Leicester Curve that he worked for include Oliver!, Simply Cinderella, The Pillowman, Hot Stuff, Gypsy, The King & I, Obama the Mamba, Piaf and Hello Dolly.

Other productions he was involved in include The Prodigals at the Gilded Balloon, Edinburgh Festival; Cendrillon (Monte Carlo); Mother Goose; Aladdin; Cinderella; Snow White and Dick Whittington at the Regent Theatre, Stoke-on-Trent; Panto's On Strike at the Manchester Opera House; and Hedda Gabler at the Royal Theatre, Northampton. Harrison is a regular associate of ARTBUILDING PROJECTS, consulting on audio installations of theatres and art spaces across Europe.

In 2015, Harrison took charge of the sound for a production of Hairspray in Leicester. In 2016, the production toured the UK to venues such as the Edinburgh Playhouse.

In 2016, Harrison designed the sound for a production of Into the Woods, put on by Opera North at the West Yorkshire Playhouse.
