= 2010 Evening Standard Theatre Awards =

Theatrical awards

The 2010 Evening Standard Theatre Awards were announced on 29 November 2010. The shortlist was revealed on 22 November 2010 and the longlist on 25 October 2010.

== Winners, shortlist and longlist ==
= winner

=== Best Play ===
- Clybourne Park by Bruce Norris (Royal Court)
- Cock by Mike Bartlett (Royal Court)
- Sucker Punch by Roy Williams (Royal Court)

==== Longlisted ====
- The Big Fellah by Richard Bean (Lyric Hammersmith)
- The Habit of Art by Alan Bennett (National's Lyttelton)
- Beautiful Burnout by Bryony Lavery (York Hall)
- Ruined by Lynn Nottage (Almeida)
- Posh by Laura Wade (Royal Court)

=== Best Director ===
- Howard Davies for The White Guard (National's Lyttelton) & All My Sons (Apollo)
- Nicholas Hytner for The Habit of Art (National's Lyttelton) & London Assurance (National's Olivier) & Hamlet (National's Olivier)
- Laurie Sansom for Beyond the Horizon and Spring Storm (National's Cottesloe)
- Thea Sharrock for After the Dance (National's Lyttelton)

==== Longlisted ====
- Dominic Cooke for Clybourne Park (Royal Court)
- Rupert Goold for Romeo and Juliet (RSC Stratford) & Earthquakes in London (National's Cottesloe)
- Michael Grandage for Red (Donmar Warehouse) & Danton's Death (National's Olivier)
- Jeremy Herrin for Spur of the Moment (Royal Court)
- Joe Hill-Gibbins for The Beauty Queen of Leenane (Young Vic)
- James MacDonald for Cock (Royal Court)
- Roger Michell for Rope (Almeida)
- Lyndsey Turner for Posh (Royal Court)

=== Best Actor ===
- Rory Kinnear, Measure for Measure (Almeida) & Hamlet (National's Olivier)
- Roger Allam, Henry IV Parts One and Two (Shakespeare's Globe)
- David Suchet, All My Sons (Apollo)

==== Longlisted ====
- Bertie Carvel, Rope (Almeida)
- Benedict Cumberbatch, After the Dance (National's Lyttelton)
- Martin Freeman, Clybourne Park (Royal Court)
- Alex Jennings, The Habit of Art (National's Lyttelton)
- Adrian Lester, Cat on a Hot Tin Roof (Novello)
- Alfred Molina, Red (Donmar Warehouse)
- Jonathan Pryce, The Caretaker (Trafalgar Studios)
- Simon Russell Beale, London Assurance (National's Olivier) & Deathtrap (Noël Coward)
- Adrian Scarborough, After the Dance (National's Lyttelton)

=== Natasha Richardson Award for Best Actress ===
- Nancy Carroll, After the Dance (National's Lyttelton)
- Elena Roger, Passion (Donmar Warehouse)
- Sheridan Smith, Legally Blonde (Savoy)
- Sophie Thompson, Clybourne Park (Royal Court)

==== Longlisted ====
- Gemma Arterton, The Little Dog Laughed (Garrick)
- Judi Dench, A Midsummer Night's Dream (Rose, Kingston)
- Tamsin Greig, The Little Dog Laughed (Garrick)
- Jenny Jules, Ruined (Almeida)
- Keira Knightley, The Misanthrope (Comedy Theatre)
- Amanda Lawrence, Jiggery Pokery (BAC) & Henry VIII (Shakespeare's Globe)
- Rosaleen Linehan, The Beauty Queen of Leenane (Young Vic)
- Helen McCrory, The Late Middle Classes (Donmar Warehouse)
- Lesley Manville, Six Degrees of Separation (Old Vic)
- Anna Maxwell Martin, Measure for Measure (Almeida)
- Fiona Shaw, London Assurance (National's Olivier)
- Zoë Wanamaker, All My Sons (Apollo)

=== Ned Sherrin Award for Best Musical ===
- Passion, Donmar Warehouse
- Legally Blonde, Savoy Theatre
- Les Misérables (2010), a Cameron Mackintosh production at Barbican Theatre

==== Longlisted ====
- Hair, Gielgud Theatre
- The Human Comedy, a Young Vic/The Opera Group production co-produced with Watford Palace Theatre
- Sweet Charity, Menier Chocolate Factory, transferred to Theatre Royal Haymarket

=== Best Design ===
- Miriam Buether for Sucker Punch (Royal Court) & Earthquakes in London (National's Cottesloe)
- Bunny Christie for The White Guard (National's Lyttelton)
- Christopher Oram for Passion (Donmar Warehouse) & Red (Donmar Warehouse)

==== Longlisted ====
- Lez Brotherston for The Rise and Fall of Little Voice (Vaudeville) & Measure for Measure (Almeida) & Women Beware Women (National's Olivier) & Design for Living (Old Vic)
- Rob Howell for Private Lives (Vaudeville) & Deathtrap (Noël Coward)
- Vicki Mortimer for The Cat in the Hat (National's Cottesloe; transferred to Young Vic)
- Mark Thompson for London Assurance (National's Olivier)

=== Charles Wintour Award for Most Promising Playwright ===
- Anya Reiss for Spur of the Moment (Royal Court)
- DC Moore for The Empire (Royal Court)
- Nick Payne for If There Is I Haven't Found It Yet (Bush) & Wanderlust (Royal Court)

==== Longlisted ====
- James Graham for The Whisky Taster (Bush) & The Man (Finborough)
- Atiha Sen Gupta for What Fatima Did (Hampstead)
- Penelope Skinner for Eigengrau (Bush)

=== Milton Shulman Award for Outstanding Newcomer ===
- You Me Bum Bum Train created by Kate Bond and Morgan Lloyd (LEB Building, E2)
- Melanie C for her performance in Blood Brothers (Phoenix Theatre)
- Daniel Kaluuya for his performance in Sucker Punch (Royal Court)
- Isabella Laughland for her performance in Wanderlust (Royal Court)
- Shannon Tarbet for her performance in Spur of the Moment (Royal Court)

==== Longlisted ====
- Laura Dos Santos for her performance in Educating Rita (Menier Chocolate Factory, transferred to Trafalgar Studios)
- Simon Godwin for his direction of Wanderlust (Royal Court)
- Henry Lloyd-Hughes for his performances in Rope (Almeida) and Posh (Royal Court)
- James McArdle for his performance in Spur of the Moment (Royal Court)
- James Musgrave for his performance in Wanderlust (Royal Court)
- Nikesh Patel for his performance in Disconnect (Royal Court)

=== Editor's Award ===
- Daniel Kaluuya for his performance in Sucker Punch (Royal Court)

=== Lebedev Special Award ===
- Sir Michael Gambon for his contribution to theatre

=== Moscow Art Theatre's Golden Seagull ===
- Sir Peter Hall

== Judges ==
- Sarah Sands, London Evening Standard
- Henry Hitchings, London Evening Standard
- Georgina Brown, Mail on Sunday
- Susannah Clapp, The Observer
- Charles Spencer, Daily Telegraph
- Matt Wolf, International Herald Tribune
- Evgeny Lebedev, London Evening Standard
