= Kevin Doyle (actor) =

English actor (born 1959/1960)

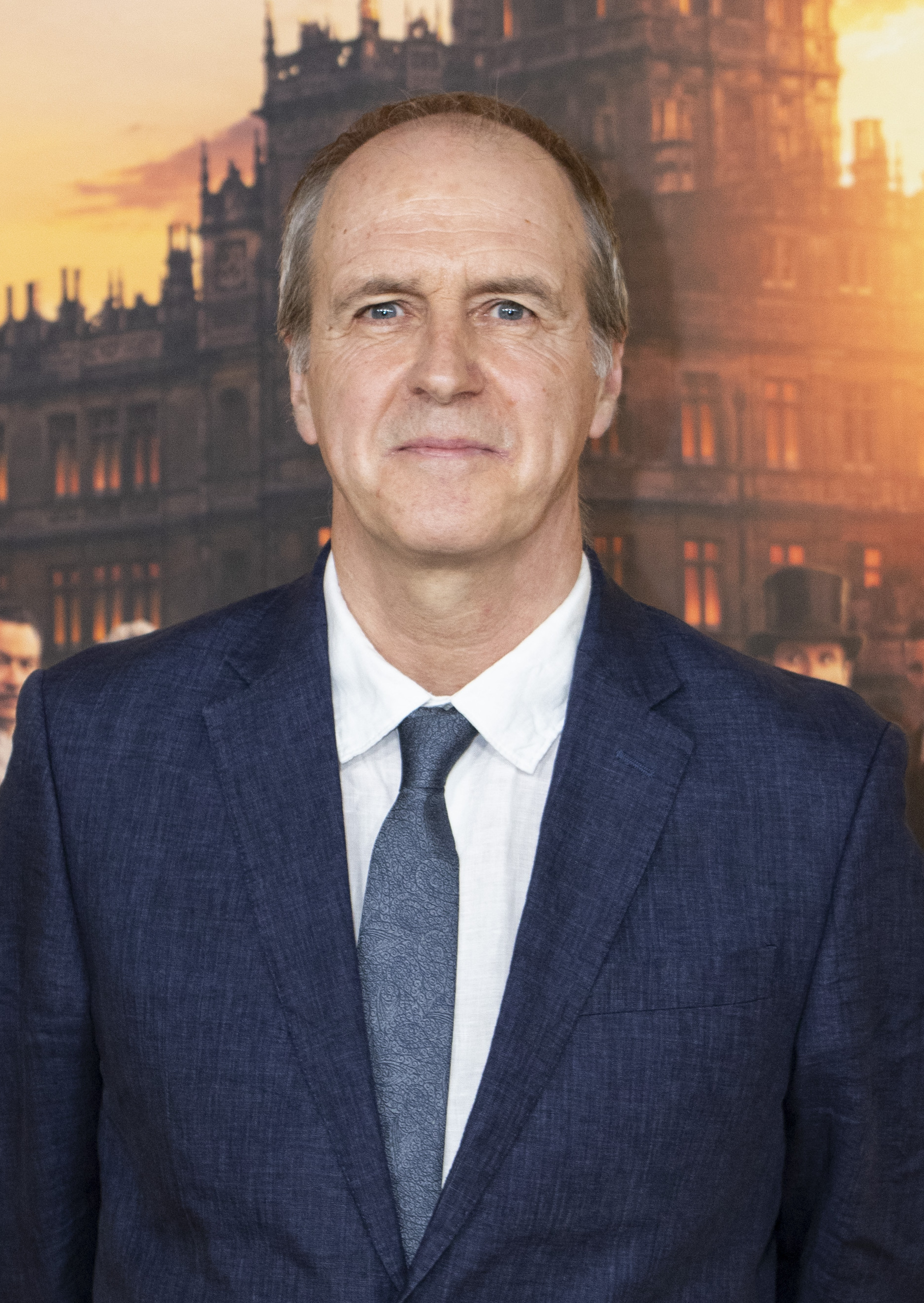
- Doyle in 2025
- Born: 1959 or 1960 (age 65–66); Scunthorpe, Lincolnshire, England
- Years active: 1982–present
- Known for: Joseph Molesley in Downton Abbey

Kevin Doyle (born 1959 or 1960) is an English actor. He has worked extensively on stage and television, and is best known for playing the footman Joseph Molesley in the TV series Downton Abbey, as well as Detective Sergeant John Wadsworth in Happy Valley, and John Parr in the TV series The Lakes.

== Career ==
Kevin Doyle appeared in Coronation Street and The Crimson Field.

In 2005 he appeared in the Poirot episode “After the Funeral”, as Inspector Morton.

Among many other television roles, Doyle played the footman, Joseph Molesley, in the TV series Downton Abbey. He also took the role of DS John Wadsworth in Happy Valley, and John Parr in the TV series The Lakes.

== Awards ==
Doyle won two Screen Actors Guild awards and the 2016 Royal Television Society award for "Best Performance in a Single Drama or Drama Series (Male)" for his performance in Happy Valley.

== Filmography ==
=== Film ===
Year	Title	Role	Notes
1996	A Midsummer Night's Dream	Demetrius	
2002	A Social Call	Man in Car	
2004	The Libertine	Constable	
2008	Good	Commandant	
2018	Ready to Go	Lance	Short film
2019	Downton Abbey	Mr. Molesley	
2021	Resurrection	Joseph of Arimathea	
2022	Downton Abbey: A New Era	Mr. Molesley	
2025	Downton Abbey: The Grand Finale	Mr. Molesley	

=== Television ===
Year	Title	Role	Notes
1984	Keep on Running	Neil Pearson	Television film
1984	Sharing Time	Mark	Episode 6: "Autumn Break"
1984	Shine on Harvey Moon	Man in Club	Series 3; Episode 4: "I’m Gonna Wash That Man Right Out of My Hair"
1985	Blott on the Landscape	Waiter	Mini-series; Episode 1: "A Phone Call"
1985	Ties of Blood	Soldier in Street	Mini-series; Episode 4: "Invitation to a Party"
1986	Auf Wiedersehen, Pet	Det. Sgt. Laurence	Series 2; Episode 3: "A Law for the Rich"
1987	Coronation Street	Hugh Ridley	2 episodes
1994	The Stand	Sarge	Mini-series; 2 episodes: "The Plague" and "The Dreams"
1994	The Bill	Mr. Wales	Series 10; Episode 14: "Keeping Mum"
1997–1999	The Lakes	John Parr / John Fisher	Series 1 & 2; 12 episodes
1998	Silent Witness	Martin Evans	Series 3; Episodes 1 & 2: "An Academic Exercise: Parts 1 & 2"
1998	The Bill	DC Travis	Series 14; Episode 62: "One of Us"
1999	Holby City	Simon Harwood	Series 1; Episodes 1, 2 & 4
1999–2000	Badger	DI David Armitage	Series 1 & 2; 13 episodes
2000	North Square	Judge Michael Arbuthnot	Episodes 5 & 6
2000–2003	At Home with the Braithwaites	Mike Hartnoll	Series 1–4; 21 episodes
2001	Always and Everyone	Carl	Series 3; Episode 9
2003	Murphy's Law	Richard Mooney	Episode 2: “Electric Bill”
2003	The Eustace Bros.	Ian Wardinski	Episode 5
2004	Down to Earth	Colin Drake	Series 4; Episode 4: “Can’t Buy You Love”
2004	Family Business	Interviewing Officer	Episode 4
2004	Blue Murder	Larry	Series 2; Episode 4: “Lonely”
2004	Blackpool	Steve	Mini-series; Episodes 1–6
2004	Midsomer Murders	Ferdy Villiers	Series 7; Episode 7: “Ghosts of Christmas Past”
2004	Casualty	Barry Ricks	Series 19; Episodes 1 & 2: “The Ties That Bind Us: Part 1 and 2”
2005	Big Dippers	Norman	Television film
2005	The Rotters' Club	Colin Trotter	Mini-series; Episodes 1–3
2005	The Last Detective	Alan Kingwell	Series 3; Episode 4: "Willesden Confidential"
2005	Afterlife	Roy Tufnell	Series 1; Episode 2: "Lower Than Bones"
2005	The Brief	Will Browning	Series 2; Episode 4: "The Architect’s Wife"
2006	Wild at Heart	Richard Chapman	Series 1; Episode 5
2006	Agatha Christie’s Poirot	Inspector Morton	Series 10; Episode 3: "After the Funeral"
2006	Brief Encounters	Mark Deary	Mini-series; Episode 8: "Ted"
2006	Casualty	Dennis Tooms	Series 21; Episode 14: "In Good Faith"
2006	The Bill	David Coles	Series 22; Episodes 52 & 83: "Bad Day in the Office" and "A Stiff Upper Lip"
2006–2007	Drop Dead Gorgeous	Howard Crane	Series 1 & 2; 9 episodes
2007	Foyle’s War	Michael Richards	Series 4; Episode 4: "Casualties of War"
2007	Dalziel and Pascoe	Adam Bolt	Series 12; Episodes 3 & 4: "Project Aphrodite: Part 1 & 2"
2007	The Royal	Ralph Fleming	Series 6; Episode 8: "Coming to the Boil"
2007	Secret Diary of a Call Girl	Lewis	Series 1; Episode 6
2007	Heartbeat	Anthony Barlow	Series 17; Episode 7: "Burying the Past"
2008	Trial & Retribution	Keane	Series 11; Episode 9: "Tracks: Part 1"
2008	HolbyBlue	Sean Burrows	Series 2; Episodes 4–6
2008	Inspector George Gently	Robert Stratton	Series 1; Episode 2: “Bomber’s Moon”
2008	Silent Witness	Chistopher Andrews	Series 12; Episodes 11 & 12: “Finding Rachel: Parts 1 & 2”
2009	Casualty	Alan Callerton	Series 23; Episode 23: “Midday Sun”
2009	Paradox	Harry Phelps	Mini-series; Episode 1
2009	The Tudors	John Constable	Series 3; Episodes 1–3
2009	The Bill	Brendan Lawler	Series 25; Episode 28: “Old Habits”
2009	Sleep with Me	Stronson	Television film
2010	Survivors	Mr. Stevens	Series 2; Episode 5
2010	Five Days	Prof. Paul Askew	Series 2; Episode 3 "Day 8"
2010	Vexed	Andrew Bridgley	Series 1; Episode 2
2010	Law & Order: UK	Paul Darnell	Series 3; Episode 2: “Hounded”
2010	Little Crackers	Dick	Series 1; Episode 7: "Jo Brand’s Little Cracker: Goodbye Fluff"
2010–2015	Downton Abbey	Joseph Molesley	Series 1–6; 46 episodes
2011	Midsomer Murders	Paddy Powell	Series 14; Episode 4: “The Oblong Murders”
2011–2012	Scott & Bailey	Geoff Hastings	Series 1 & 2; 5 episodes
2012	Secrets and Words	Mr. Edwards	Episode 4: “The Crossing”
2012	Accused	Ferris	Series 2; Episode 4: “Tina’s Story”
2012	Room at the Top	Mr. Thompson	Mini-series; Episodes 1 & 2
2012	New Tricks	David Kemp	Series 9; Episode 6: “Love Means Nothing in Tennis”
2013	Playhouse Presents	Job Interviewer	Series 2; Episode 2: "Snodgrass"
2013	Hawaii Five-0	Dave Parsons	Series 3; Episode 22: "Ho'opio (To Take Captive)"
2014	The Crimson Field	Lt. Col. Roland Brett	Episodes 1–6
2015	A.D. The Bible Continues	Joseph of Arimathea	Mini-series; Episodes 1–6
2016	Happy Valley	DS John Wadsworth	Series 2; Episodes 1–6
2016	Reg	Returning Officer	Television film
2016	Paranoid	Ghost Detective / Steffan Fairweather	Mini-series; Episodes 1–7
2017	Doc Martin	Jack Newcross	Series 8; Episode 4: “Faith”
2018	Old Vic: In Camera - Fanny & Alexander	Edvard	Television film
2018	Care	Chairman	Television film
2019	Death in Paradise	Terry Brownlow	Series 8; Episode 3: “Wish You Weren’t Here”
2020	Miss Scarlet and The Duke	Henry Scarlet	Series 1; 5 episodes
2021	Silent Witness	Governor Matt Blake	Series 24; Episodes 1 & 2: "Redemption: Parts 1 & 2"
2021	The Witcher	Ba’lian	Series 2; Episode 4: "Redanian Intelligence"
2022	Sherwood	Fred Rowley	Series 1; Episodes 1–6
2023	Vera	Ronnie Brown	Series 12; Episode 4: "The Darkest Evening"
2024	Until I Kill You	David	Episodes 3 & 4: "Healing" and "Justice"
2024	Ridley	Ross Enderby	Series 2; Episodes 3 & 4: "The Hollow Tree: Parts 1 & 2"
2025	The Hack	Assistant Commissioner John Yates	Series1
2025	Ridley	Ross Enderby	Series 2; Episodes 3 & 4: "The Hollow Tree: Parts 1 & 2"
2025	Riot Women	Michael	3 episodes

=== Stage ===
Doyle has worked extensively in theatre, including over 10 productions with the Royal Shakespeare Company (RSC). His credits include:

Title	Venue	Role
NSFW by Lucy Kirkwood	Royal Court Theatre	Mr. Bradshaw
Spur of the Moment by Anya Reiss	Royal Court Theatre	Nick Evans
The White Guard by Mikhail Bulgakov	National Theatre	Colonel Vladimir Talberg
For King and Country	Touring Partnership	Padre
The Mob	Orange Tree	Stephen More
Henry V	RSC	Ely
Coriolanus	RSC	Nicanor
A Midsummer Night's Dream	RSC	Demetrius
Romeo and Juliet	RSC	Benvolio
Hamlet	Haworth Shakespeare Festival, New Jersey	Hamlet
Hay Fever	Cambridge Theatre Company	Simon Bliss
Richard III	RSC	Grey
Mutabililitie by Frank McGuinness	National Theatre	Commandant
Before the Dawn by Kate Bush	Hammersmith Apollo	Astronomer
