= Rellik =

Rellik (killer spelled backwards) may refer to:

- Rellik (wrestler), American professional wrestler, real name Jon Hugger
- Rellik (TV series), a British TV series, airing on both British BBC One and American premium channel Cinemax
