= Love Sarah =

2020 film

- Directed by: Eliza Schroeder
- Written by: Mahalia Rimmer; Jake Brunger; Eliza Schroeder
- Starring: Celia Imrie; Shelley Conn; Shannon Tarbet; Rupert Penry-Jones; Bill Paterson
- Cinematography: Aaron Reid
- Edited by: Jim Hampton; Laura Morrod
- Music by: Enis Rotthoff
- Distributed by: Parkland Entertainment
- Release date: February 20, 2020
- Running time: 97 minutes
- Country: United Kingdom
- Language: English

Love Sarah is a 2020 film directed by Eliza Schroeder starring Celia Imrie, Shelley Conn, Shannon Tarbet, and Rupert Penry-Jones.

== Plot ==
Sarah, a talented baker, is killed in a bike accident on her way to pick up the keys to her brand new bakery venture. Her best friend, Isabella, the joint owner of the bakery space, must work together with Sarah's daughter, Clarissa, and Sarah's estranged mother, Mimi, to fulfill the dream of a successful bakery in Notting Hill, London. To do this, they take inspiration from the pastries and people that Sarah loved.

== Cast ==
- Shelley Conn as Isabella
- Celia Imrie as Mimi
- Shannon Tarbet as Clarissa
- Rupert Penry-Jones as Mathew
- Bill Paterson as Felix
- Candice Brown as Sarah
- Max Parker as Alex
- Andrew David as Clive
- Yûho Yamashita as Yuho
- Sam Shoubber as Ausama
- Louis Campbell as John
