= James McArdle =

Scottish actor (born 1989)

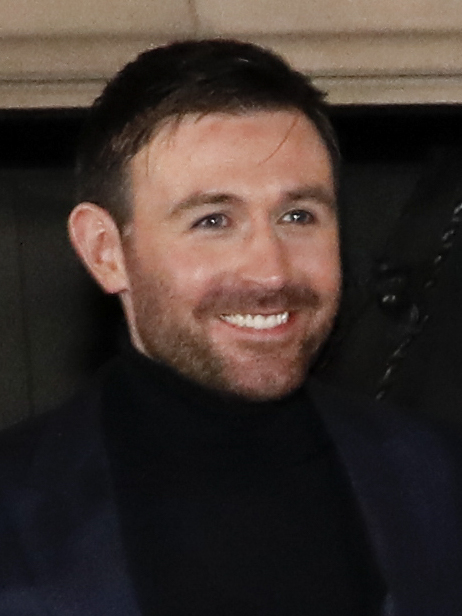
- McArdle at the Mary Queen of Scots premiere in 2019
- Born: James John McArdle; 3 April 1989 (age 37); Glasgow, Scotland
- Education: Royal Academy of Dramatic Art
- Occupation: Actor
- Years active: 2010–present

James John McArdle (born 3 April 1989) is a Scottish actor. He won the Ian Charleson Award for his role as Mikhail Platonov in Platonov and was nominated for an Laurence Olivier Award for Best Actor in a Supporting Role for portraying Louis Ironson in Angels in America.

== Early life ==
McArdle was born in Glasgow, growing up in the city's Darnley neighbourhood and attending St Ninian's High School, Giffnock. As a child he attended PACE Theatre Company in nearby Paisley. Having worked as a child actor in films, at 17 he made the decision to travel by bus to London to train as a professional without informing his parents; he was accepted to RADA after initially fluffing his audition lines but managing to return and impress the selectors. He left the course towards its end in 2010, and in the same year he appeared in Macbeth at The Globe and starred in the summer smash hit Spur of the Moment by Anya Reiss at the Royal Court Theatre in London. He was also well received in his role in A Month in the Country by Ivan Turgenev at the Chichester Festival Theatre.

== Career ==
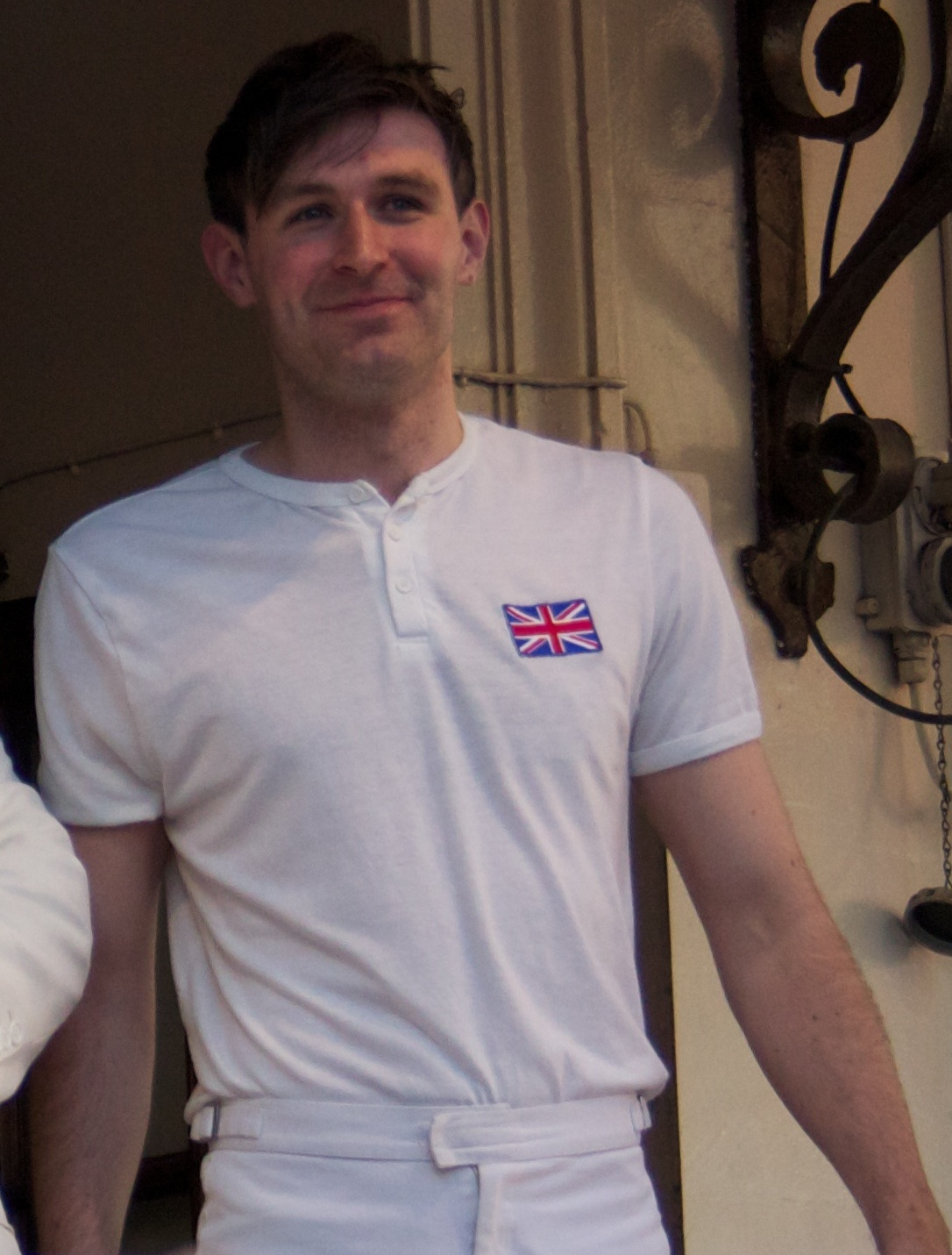
McArdle as his Chariots of Fire character at the 2012 Summer Olympics torch relay

In 2011 McArdle played the role of Agathon in Emperor and Galilean by Henrik Ibsen at the National Theatre. He was also Robin Hood in the 2011 RSC production of The Legend, adapted by Ella Hickson.

In 2012 he starred as Harold Abrahams in Chariots of Fire, Mike Bartlett's stage adaptation of the film of the same title, which opened at London's Hampstead Theatre on 9 May and transferred to the West End on 23 June, running through to 5 January 2013.

He portrayed King James I of Scotland in Rona Munro's King James I, which was performed at the National Theatre and the Edinburgh International Festival in 2014.

In 2016 McArdle won the Ian Charleson Award for his 2015 performance as Platonov in Platonov at the Chichester Festival Theatre

In 2017 McArdle's performance as Louis Ironson in Angels in America at the National Theatre Lyttleton in London earned him a nomination for the Olivier Award for Best Actor in a Supporting Role. In March 2018 he stayed with the production when it transferred to Broadway for an 18-week engagement at the Neil Simon Theatre and was nominated for the Drama Desk Award for Outstanding Actor in a Play.

In 2024 McArdle played the lead role in the comedy Four Mothers, an Irish-set adaptation of the Gianni Di Gregorio 2008 Italian film Mid-August Lunch, playing a gay young adult fiction writer taking care of his widowed mother. The film won the BFI London Film Festival Audience Award in 2024.

In 2026, he played King James VI in the BBC docu-drama adaptation of Gareth Russell's book Queen James.

== Acting credits ==
=== Theatre ===
Year	Title	Role	Location	Ref(s)
2010	Macbeth	Malcolm	The Globe	
2010	Spur of the Moment	Daniel Mast	Royal Court Theatre	
2010	A Month in the Country	Aleksei Belyaev	Chichester Festival Theatre	
2011	Emperor and Galilean	Agathon	National Theatre	
2011	The Heart of Robin Hood	Robin Hood	Royal Shakespeare Company	
2012	Chariots of Fire	Harold Abrahams	Hampstead Theatre	
2012	Chariots of Fire	Harold Abrahams	Gielgud Theatre	
2014	James I: The Key Will Keep The Lock	James I of Scotland	National Theatre	
2014	James I: The Key Will Keep The Lock	James I of Scotland	Edinburgh International Festival	
2014	James I: The Key Will Keep The Lock	James I of Scotland	National Theatre of Scotland	
2015	Platonov	Mikhail Platonov	Chichester Festival Theatre	
2015	Ivanov	Yevgeni Lvov	Chichester Festival Theatre	
2016	Platonov	Mikhail Platonov	National Theatre	
2016	Ivanov	Yevgeni Lvov	National Theatre	
2017	Angels in America	Louis Ironson	National Theatre	
2018	Angels in America	Louis Ironson	Neil Simon Theatre	
2019	Peter Gynt	Peter Gynt	National Theatre	
2021	The Tragedy of Macbeth	Macbeth	Almeida Theatre	
2024	The Real Thing	Henry	Old Vic Theatre	
2025	Bacchae	Pentheus	National Theatre	

=== Television ===
Year	Title	Role	Notes
2011	Appropriate Adult	Stephen West	2 episodes
2011	Page Eight	Ted Finch	Television film
2013	Love and Marriage	Charlie McCallister	6 episodes
2014	New Worlds	Will Blood	Miniseries
2014	Salting the Battlefield	Ted Finch	Television film
2014	Turks & Caicos	Ted Finch	Television film
2014	37 Days	Alec	Miniseries
2017	Man in an Orange Shirt	Thomas March	Television film
2021	Mare of Easttown	Deacon Mark Burton	Miniseries
2022	Life After Life	Hugh Todd	Main cast
2022	Andor	Timm Karlo	3 episodes
2024	Sexy Beast	Gal Dove	Main cast
2025	Playing Nice	Miles Lambert	Miniseries
2026	War	Nicholas Taylor	Main cast
2026	Queen James	James VI and I	1-episode documentary

=== Film ===
Year	Title	Role	Notes
2012	Private Peaceful	Lieutenant Buckland	
2014	'71	Sergeant Mark McGowen	
2015	Star Wars: The Force Awakens	Niv Lek	
2016	On The Road	Joe	
2016	The Chamber	Parks	
2018	Mary Queen of Scots	James Stewart, Earl of Moray	
2020	Ammonite	Roderick Murchison	
2024	Four Mothers	Edward	
TBA	The Custom of the Country †		Filming

== Awards and nominations ==
Year	Association	Category	Work	Result
2010	Ian Charleson Awards	Special Commendation	Macbeth	Nominated
2010	Ian Charleson Awards	Special Commendation	A Month in the Country	Nominated
2010	Evening Standard Awards	Outstanding Newcomer	Spur of the Moment	Nominated
2015	Ian Charleson Awards	1st Place	Platonov	Won
2016	Evening Standard Awards	Best Actor	Platonov	Nominated
2018	Laurence Olivier Awards	Best Actor in a Supporting Role	Angels in America	Nominated
2018	Theatre World Award		Angels in America	Won
2018	Drama League Awards	Distinguished Performance	Angels in America	Nominated
2018	Drama Desk Awards	Best Actor in a Play	Angels in America	Nominated
2019	h100 Awards	Theatre & Performance	Peter Gynt	Nominated
2025	British Academy Scotland Awards	Best Actor (Film/Television)	Four Mothers	Won
2026	Irish Film & Television Awards	Best International Actor	Four Mothers	Nominated
