= Underwire Film Festival =

Annual film festival held in London, United Kingdom

The Underwire Film Festival was an annual event observing short films made with a major female contribution. Held in London, this film festival was dedicated to promoting and celebrating female talent across the UK television and film industry. Underwire Awards recognise teamwork, skill, artistry, vision and endeavour of women who have excelled in key production roles, both as actors and from the production team.

== History ==
The Underwire Film Festival began in 2010 founded by Gabriella Apicella and Gemma Mitchell to help tackle the gender imbalance within the film industry, and focusses on short films. 2011 Underwire Festival co-director, Helen Jack, noted that the gap in 2011 between gender of short film directors, was quite possibly as high as one female to nine male directors. In 2018, the number of film entries submitted to the Underwire Film Festival had grown to a purported 1000 submissions.

In its early years, the Underwire Festival awards were held at the Ritzy Cinema in Brixton, London. In recent years it has been held at the Barbican Centre, London. In its third year in 2012, the festival expanded as the number of short film submissions went up three-fold. The 2020 festival was cancelled due to the COVID-19 pandemic, however, the Underwire Festival was due to make a return on September 5, 2021.

The Underwire Film Festival is a BAFTA recognised film festival since 2015.

Underwire is no longer running and seems to have concluded with a final festival held in 2022.

== Aims ==
The Underwire Awards are given in recognition of the teamwork, skill, artistry, vision or endeavour of women who have excelled in key production roles. The long-term goal to improve equality statistics not just in front of the camera, but behind it too for traditionally male dominated roles like directing, producing, screenwriting, editing, cinematography, sound design, composing, production design and animation The festival covers a broad range of genres including drama, documentary, music video, artist film and animation, with the only stipulations being, that one of the major production roles is led by a woman, and that the film run time is 20 minutes or less. The festival awards training and mentoring opportunities as part of the award prize.

== Award categories ==
Each category receives a number of nominations from which the eventual winner is decided. Categories are:

- Best Actor
- Under 25: for outstanding work by a female practitioner aged 15–25
- XX Award: for the best onscreen female protagonist
- Best Director
- Best Producer
- Best screenwriter
- Best Editor
- Best Cinematographer
- Best Composer
- Best Sound Designer
- Best Production Designer
- Best Animator

== Award Winners timeline ==
Some previous winners include:

- Lolita Chakrabarti - best producer 2011
- Francesca Fowler - best screenwriter 2012
- Moira Buffini - best screenwriter 2013
- Shannon Tarbet - best actor 2013
- Prano Bailey-Bond - best director 2013
- Mandeep Dhillon - best actor 2017
- Free Period (Short Film) - XX Award 2017
- Anna Phoebe - best composer 2018
