= Shelley Conn =

English actress

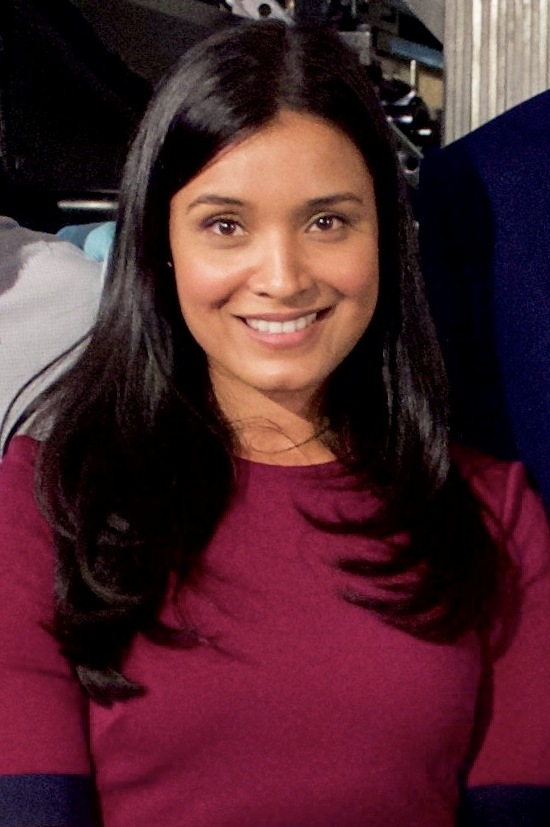
- Conn in 2016
- Born: Shelley Conn; 21 September 1976 (age 50); London, England
- Education: Webber Douglas Academy of Dramatic Art
- Occupation: Actress
- Years active: 2000–present
- Spouse: Jonathan Kerrigan (m. 2011)
- Children: 1

Shelley Conn (born 21 September 1976) is an English actress. On television, she is known for her roles in the BBC series Mistresses (2008–2010) and By Any Means (2013), the Sky One series Strike Back (2010), the Fox series Terra Nova (2011), the Netflix series Bridgerton (2022), and the Amazon Prime series Good Omens and Gen V (both 2023). Her films include Love Sarah (2020).

== Early life and education ==
Shelley Conn was born on 21 September 1976 in London, England. During her childhood, her family moved between military bases, and she lived in Germany and Gibraltar with her parents and two older sisters before the family returned to London. Conn acted in school plays. She attended Queen Mary's College, a sixth-form college based in Basingstoke, before training at the Webber Douglas Academy of Dramatic Art. She is of Anglo-Indian origin.

== Career ==
After drama school, Conn had a series of small roles in various British films, before coming to prominence when she starred as Ashika Chandiramani in the BBC series Party Animals. In 2001, she picked up the role of PC Miriam Da Silva in BBC1's Mersey Beat and an irregularly recurring role in Casualty. The following year, Conn made her West End theatre stage debut in three plays after transferring from Stratford-upon-Avon in the Royal Shakespeare Company's Jacobean Season at the Gielgud Theatre – The Island Princess, Eastward Ho! and The Roman Actor.

Conn has appeared television, film and theatre, with a series of leading roles in various small budget European as well as British films namely BBC character dramas such as The Innocence Project, and occasional returns to the RSC. Conn joined Series Five of the popular BBC One series Down to Earth in 2004. In early 2008, she starred as Miranda Hill in The Palace, as Jessica in Mistresses and as Neela Sahjani in Trial & Retribution. That same year, Conn appeared as Claire in Dead Set. In 2010, she played Danni Prendiville in the TV series Strike Back.

Conn was chosen by Steven Spielberg to be one of the leads in the $150 million TV series Terra Nova, which premiered on 26 September 2011. In 2014, she appeared in a US TV series called The Lottery.

Conn starred as Mary Sharma in the second series of the Netflix romance period drama Bridgerton based on Julia Quinn's second novel in her Bridgerton series, The Viscount Who Loved Me. The series was released in March 2022.

Conn starred as Beelzebub in the second series of Good Omens, and Indira Shetty (a stand-in for Billy Butcher in-adaptation of We Gotta Go Now and The Bloody Doors Off) in the first season of The Boys spin-off series Gen V, both for Amazon Prime Video.

== Personal life ==
Conn married British actor Jonathan Kerrigan in 2011, and they have a son, born in 2012.

Conn ran in the 2006 London Marathon.

== Filmography ==
=== Film ===
Year	Title	Role	Notes
2000	Maybe Baby	Nurse 2	
2002	Possession	Candi	
2005	Charlie and the Chocolate Factory	Princess Pondicherry	
2005	Ripley Under Ground	Honey	
2006	L' Entente cordiale	Punam	
2006	Nina's Heavenly Delights	Nina Shah	
2007	Love Story	Sara	Short film
2008	New Town Killers	Julie Stewart	
2010	How Do You Know	Terry	
2012	Catalyst	Mia	Short film
2014	Film: The Movie	Preea Vasami	
2018	Malevolent	Professor Samantha Harlow	
2020	Love Sarah	Isabella	
2021	Fellow Creatures	The Stranger	Short film

=== Television ===
Key
†	Denotes television productions that have not yet been released

Year	Title	Role	Notes
2000	The Last Musketeer	Uzma	TV movie
2000	City Central	Naz	Episode: "No Direction Home"
2000	Attachments	Carrie Knowles	Episode: "Just Upgraded"
2000—2002	Casualty	Daljit Ramanee	3 episodes
2001	Hawkins	Sharim Raziq	TV movie
2001	Mersey Beat	PC Miriam Da Silva	Recurring; 10 episodes
2002	Man and Boy	Jasmin	TV movie
2002	Bodily Harm	Tanika	Episode: "#1.1"
2003	Second Generation	Amba	TV movie
2005	Down to Earth	Kerry Jamil	Recurring; 9 episodes
2005	Transit	Asha	TV movie
2006	Blue Murder	Emily Saunders	Episode: "Make Believe"
2006- 2007	The Innocence Project	Dr Eve Walker	Recurring; 8 episodes
2007	Party Animals	Ashika Chandiramani	Recurring; 8 episodes
2008–2010	Mistresses	Jessica Fraser	Recurring; 16 episodes
2008	Trial & Retribution	Neelah Sahjani	Episode: "Kill the King: Part 1"
2008	The Palace	Miranda Hill	4 episodes
2008	10 Days to War	Eesha	Episode: "A Simple Private Matter"
2008	Raw	Tanya	6 epsidoes
2008	Dead Set	Claire	3 episodes
2010	The Persuasionists	Tamsin	Episode: "Diet Stuff"
2010	Strike Back	Danni Prendiville	5 episodes
2011	Marchlands	Nisha Parekh	5 episodes
2011	Terra Nova	Dr. Elisabeth Shannon	13 episodes
2012	Silent Witness	DI Connie James	2 episodes
2013	Heading Out	Eve	6 episodes
2013	By Any Means	Jessica Jones	6 episodes
2014	24: Live Another Day	Helen McCarthy	Episode: "Day 9: 5:00 p.m. - 6:00 p.m."
2014	The Lottery	Gabrielle Westwood	Main role; 10 episodes
2015	W1A	Azia Zamani	Episode: "#2.4"
2016	Heartbeat	Millicent Patel	Main role; 10 episodes
2017	Back	Annie	Episode: "#1.4"
2017–2020	Liar	DI Vanessa Harmon	11 episodes
2018	Sky Comedy: Sindhu Vee's Live and Let Love	Gita	Mini series
2019	Death in Paradise	Marina Shepherd	Episode: "Muder Most Animal"
2019	Deep State	Nicole Miller	4 episodes
2019	Four Weddings and a Funeral	Liz	Episode: "Hounslow"
2019	The Rook	Danielle Wulff	4 episodes
2020	The Deceived	Ruth	4 episodes
2021	Star Stable: Mistfall	Sigry Varanger	2 episodes
2021	McDonald & Dodds	Hilary O'Doyle	Episode: "We Need to Talk About Doreen"
2021	The Irregulars	Dion Cross	Episode: "Chapter Three: Ipsissimus"
2021	Dodo	Headmistress / Mrs Sidiqui (voice)	7 episodes
2021	Four Lives	Nadia Persaud	Episode: "#1.2"
2022	Bridgerton	Lady Mary Sheffield/Sharma	Main role (season 2); 8 episodes
2023	Good Omens	Beelzebub	Main role (season 2); 4 episodes
2023	Gen V	Indira Shetty	Main role (season 1); 8 episodes
2024	Alex Rider	Laura Kellner	6 episodes
2025	Wisting	Detective Harriet Dunn	1 episode
2025	Little Disasters	Charlotte	Main role (season 1)
2026	Adultery	Hannah Kirkman	6 episodes
