= The Wonderful World of Dissocia =

2002 play by Anthony Neilson

The cover of the original playtext uses an image from Lisa's "subconscious imagination"

The Wonderful World of Dissocia is a play written and directed by Anthony Neilson about a young woman suffering from dissociative disorder. The idea was originally workshopped with a group of students at LAMDA in 2002 but was later re-written and produced for the Glasgow's Tron Theatre at the Edinburgh International Festival in 2004. The play won Neilson the 2004-5 CATS award for Best New Play and the production secured Best Director award for Neilsen, Best Actress award for Christine Entwisle (Lisa) and Best Design for Miriam Buether. In December 2009 The List magazine included the work in its "Best of a Decade" compilation. It toured England in 2007, making its London debut at the Royal Court Theatre in March 2007.

The United States première was at the Profiles Theater, North Broadway Street, Chicago, on 26 March 2009. The Sydney Theatre Company mounted a production at The Wharf Theatre, Sydney, Australia, on 18 April 2009. The Latin American première was at Mediterránea Café Teatro, Buenos Aires, Argentina, on 20 March 2015.

A new London production starring Leah Harvey premiered at Theatre Royal Stratford East in 2022.

== Theme ==
The play is in two contrasting acts, with the first a vivid recreation of Lisa's dream-like imaginary life, "full of colour and fun", and the second a bleak, black-and-white presentation of the hospital ward in which she is receiving treatment; because of the contrast we see the prospect of Lisa's return to wellness as rather unattractive. In this way the play attempts to give the audience a notion of how the condition affects the sufferer and offers an alternative view of conventional treatments.
