= Love Is Blind (2019 film) =

2019 American comedy-drama film

- Film poster
- Directed by: Monty Whitebloom; Andy Delaney
- Screenplay by: Jennifer Schuur
- Produced by: Alexis Alexanian; Lucy Barzun Donnelly; Alexandra Kerry
- Starring: Shannon Tarbet; Aidan Turner; Benjamin Walker; Matthew Broderick; Chloë Sevigny
- Cinematography: Monty Whitbloom
- Edited by: Alex Kopit
- Production companies: Locomotive; Regency Enterprises
- Distributed by: Uncork'd Entertainment
- Release dates: March 25, 2019 (United Kingdom); November 8, 2019
- Country: United States
- Language: English

Love Is Blind (formerly titled Beautiful Darkness) is an American independent dark comedy-drama film written by Jennifer Schuur, directed by Andy Delaney and Monty Whitebloom and starring Shannon Tarbet, Aidan Turner, Benjamin Walker, Matthew Broderick and Chloë Sevigny. It is Whitebloom and Delaney's directorial debut. It was released on video on demand on March 25, 2019 in the United Kingdom, and on November 8, 2019 in the United States.

== Plot ==
Bess Krafft is a woman with a form of selective perception where she is unable to see her mother or acknowledge her mother's existence. Her therapist, who is on the autism spectrum, orders her to spend time with a chronically suicidal man. However, Bess can't see him either.

== Cast ==
- Shannon Tarbet as Bess Krafft
- Aidan Turner as Russell Hank
- Benjamin Walker as Farmer Smithson
- Matthew Broderick as Murray Krafft
- Chloë Sevigny as Carolyn Krafft
- Mark Blum as Dr. Klienart

== Production ==
Filming began in the Hudson Valley on June 8, 2015. Filming was officially wrapped on July 6, 2015.
