= Episode 5820 =

- EastEnders episode
- Episode no.: Episode 5820
- Directed by: Laura Way
- Written by: Anya Reiss
- Original air date: 29 November 2018
- Running time: 30 minutes

Episode chronology
← Previous "Episode 5819"	Next → "Episode 5821"

"Episode 5820" of the British television soap opera EastEnders was broadcast in the United Kingdom on BBC One on 29 November 2018. The episode was directed by Laura Way and written by Anya Reiss. The plot focuses on a debate about consent among several characters, after they read about a sexual assault in the local newspaper. They are unaware that the victim is their friend and neighbour Ruby Allen (Louisa Lytton), who is forced to listen to their views, while the men she has accused are also present.

Reiss said the episode was conceived in a bid to "open the conversation" about consent among viewers, and for those who had been sexually assaulted. Lytton also said that the serial wanted to portray the real world discussions taking place at the time. Reiss made sure that every side of the debate was heard, and no character was seen taking a particular side. The episode is set entirely in The Queen Victoria. It opens and closes in slow-motion to two soul songs sung by Irma Thomas and Nina Simone respectively. Way was hired specifically for the episode, which differs from the normal filming schedule that sees one director hired for a four-episode block.

"Episode 5820" received an audience of 5.99 million, including streaming through BBC iPlayer. It was the lowest rated episode of EastEnders airing that week. The episode received critical acclaim from television critics and viewers, who said it had "broken new ground" and inspired "vital" discussion about consent. It was also called "ambitious", "thought-provoking" and "poignant". Many critics praised Reiss' script and Lytton's performance, with some saying that she deserved award recognition. "Episode 5820" received a nomination for Best Single Episode at the 2019 British Soap Awards.

== Plot ==
Shortly after arriving at The Queen Victoria pub, Ruby Allen (Louisa Lytton) and her friend Stacey Fowler (Lacey Turner) notice Stacey's husband Martin Fowler (James Bye) drinking with his friends Ross Swinden (Ossian Luke) and Matt Clarkson (Mitchell Hunt), whom Ruby has accused of raping her. Phil Mitchell (Steve McFadden) reads the front page of the local newspaper, whose headline story states that two local men have been charged with rape. Mel Owen (Tamzin Outhwaite) tells Sharon Mitchell (Letitia Dean) that the police took CCTV footage from their club as part of the investigation. Stacey tells Ross and Matt to leave, and asks Whitney Dean (Shona McGarty) not to serve them. Linda Carter (Kellie Bright) also refuses to serve them, having realised that they are the men from the newspaper, and receives offers of help to throw them out. Ross publicly defends himself, telling the locals that a woman accepted his drinks, kissed him, went back to his place, removed her clothes, and in the morning was hungover and went to the police.

Martin defends his friends, calling it a misunderstanding, which angers his daughter, Bex Fowler (Jasmine Armfield). After Matt and Ross leave, a debate starts between the locals, with several points of view being put across about sexual assault and consent, which causes arguments between Denise Fox (Diane Parish) and Kush Kazemi (Davood Ghadami), and Martin and Stacey. Ruby wants to leave, but Stacey urges her to stay. Linda notices Ruby is upset and realises that she is the victim. She comforts Ruby and reassures her that she has done the right thing. Glenn Neyland (Todd Von Joel) enters and Martin tries to get him to leave, as Ruby is also there. A drunken Kat Moon (Jessie Wallace) accuses Glenn of being a rapist too, but he says that he has done nothing wrong and the only person who did is the liar his friends had sex with. Ruby confronts Glenn for calling her a liar, outing herself as the victim. Everyone stares at Ruby, as she returns to her seat and tells Stacey that now everyone knows, no one will believe her.

== Cast and characters ==
- Jasmine Armfield as Bex Fowler
- Emma Barton as Honey Mitchell
- Kellie Bright as Linda Carter
- James Bye as Martin Fowler
- Natalie Cassidy as Sonia Fowler
- Ricky Champ as Stuart Highway
- Letitia Dean as Sharon Mitchell
- Tanya Franks as Rainie Branning
- Davood Ghadami as Kush Kazemi
- Mitchell Hunt as Matt Clarkson
- Ossian Luke as Ross Swinden
- Louisa Lytton as Ruby Allen
- Scott Maslen as Jack Branning
- Steve McFadden as Phil Mitchell
- Shona McGarty as Whitney Dean
- Laila Morse as Mo Harris
- Tamzin Outhwaite as Mel Owen
- Diane Parish as Denise Fox
- Lacey Turner as Stacey Fowler
- Todd Von Joel as Glenn Neyland
- Rudolph Walker as Patrick Trueman
- Jessie Wallace as Kat Moon
- Jake Wood as Max Branning
- Adam Woodyatt as Ian Beale

== Production ==
=== Background ===
Following news that Louisa Lytton had reprised her role as Ruby Allen in July 2018, it was announced that her character would be at the centre of a sexual consent storyline. The serial's research team worked closely with charity Rape Crisis England and Wales, and EastEnders' executive consultant John Yorke hoped the storyline would "challenge the stereotyping and myths that can surround sexual violence and consent". The plot sees Ruby and her friend Stacey Fowler attend a party together at the local nightclub. The following day, Ruby confides in Stacey that she has been raped, but the accused Matt Clarkson has a different view of that night. Both Matt and his friend Ross Swinden are charged by the police, and details of the incident are printed in the local newspaper, although Ruby's name is not mentioned.

=== Conception and writing ===
"The episode is entirely set in the Queen Vic with a smaller amount of characters that I wouldn't usually see. Ruby walks into the pub and everyone has seen the article, and they're all speculating over the case. She thinks everyone will work out it's her when she hears things such as, 'These young girls who go out in short skirts...'"

— Lytton talking to Inside Soap's Laura-Jayne Tyler about the episode.

On 19 November 2018, Duncan Lindsay of Metro reported that EastEnders would air a special episode as part of the consent storyline, focusing on the reactions and opinions of Ruby's friends and neighbours after they learn about the incident. The episode sees Ruby come face to face with Matt and Ross in The Queen Victoria pub, before listening to everyone's views on consent and sexual assault, without knowing that she is the victim in the newspaper article. Eventually everyone learns that Matt and Ross are the men who have been charged, while Ruby reveals that she is the victim in a confrontation with their friend Glenn.

Writer Anya Reiss hoped the episode would "open the conversation" about consent, saying "We want to make the person on the sofa turn to the person next to them and ask what they think. And perhaps to make people think again." Reiss said the episode was also for people who had been sexually assaulted, whether they had told someone about their ordeal or not. Reiss thought the issue of consent was "tricky" to get right, but she wanted every side to be heard, so that no viewer would feel "attacked or misrepresented." Reiss picked out a few examples of the debate, explaining that former police officer Jack Branning (Scott Maslen) supports survivors of sexual assault, while Mo Harris (Laila Morse) believes that it is easy to stop rape. Sharon Watts, who supported Linda Carter after her own rape, thinks that alcohol can blur the lines when it comes to consent. Reiss made sure that the discussion did not become "a men versus women debate", and that no one was seen taking a particular side. During her research for the episode Reiss found that a lot of people felt relief when they realised that they were no longer alone. She added, "I hope this story, helps remind people, that they aren't alone. And that no one can change your truth."

Lytton told Lindsay (Metro) that they wanted to portray the real world discussions about consent that were occurring at the time. While working on the storyline, the actress heard several different views and questions about consent from people of all ages. Like Reiss, Lytton believed the episode would show every side of the debate. Of her character's reaction to the situation in the pub, she told Lindsay: "Each different character has a different opinion on rape and on consent and Ruby is having to be in the situation where she can hear people talking about it without knowing it's about her. The paranoia sets in – it's a different episode but I think it's needed as there have been so many questions around this storyline." When asked what would happen to her character following the end of the episode, Lytton explained that Ruby would worry about being believed and the opinions she has heard throughout the night, adding that Ruby would experience a lot of emotions as the storyline continues.

=== Filming and music ===
"Episode 5820" is set entirely in The Queen Vic and features 20 main cast members, whose characters have differing opinions on consent and sexual assault. Ruby's storyline is the sole focus of the episode. Lytton realised the episode was going to be different when Laura Way was hired specifically to direct the episode, which differs from the serial's usual shooting schedule that sees one director hired for a four-episode block. Lytton admitted that she was nervous about filming the episode on the Vic set, telling Inside Soap's Laura-Jayne Tyler, "Everyone in the show will tell you that filming in the Vic is scary – even people that I'm in awe of like Steve McFadden and Letitia Dean say it." Lytton said her knees weakened when they shot the ending with everyone staring at Ruby.

The episode opens in slow-motion to the song "Straight from the Heart" by Irma Thomas. The camera pans around The Queen Victoria showing the locals enjoying themselves. As "Episode 5820" comes to a close, another soul song – "Don't Let Me Be Misunderstood" sung by Nina Simone – begins playing over a slow-motion montage showing the "shattered peace" left by Ruby's revelation that she is the rape victim.

== Reception ==
=== Ratings ===
After seven days of the episode being shown on BBC One, it had been watched by 5.85 million people, including streaming through BBC iPlayer. This was made up of 5,598,200 views through a television set, 44,155 views on a PC or laptop, 93,564 views on a tablet computer and 116,422 views on a smartphone. Within 28 days of the original broadcast, viewership for the episode rose to just under 6 million. Television set views rose to 5,721,600, PC and laptop views went to 48,307, tablet views increased to 102,936 and smartphone views totalled 126,307. It was the eleventh most-watched programme on BBC One for its week of transmission, and the lowest rated episode of EastEnders that week.

=== Critical response ===
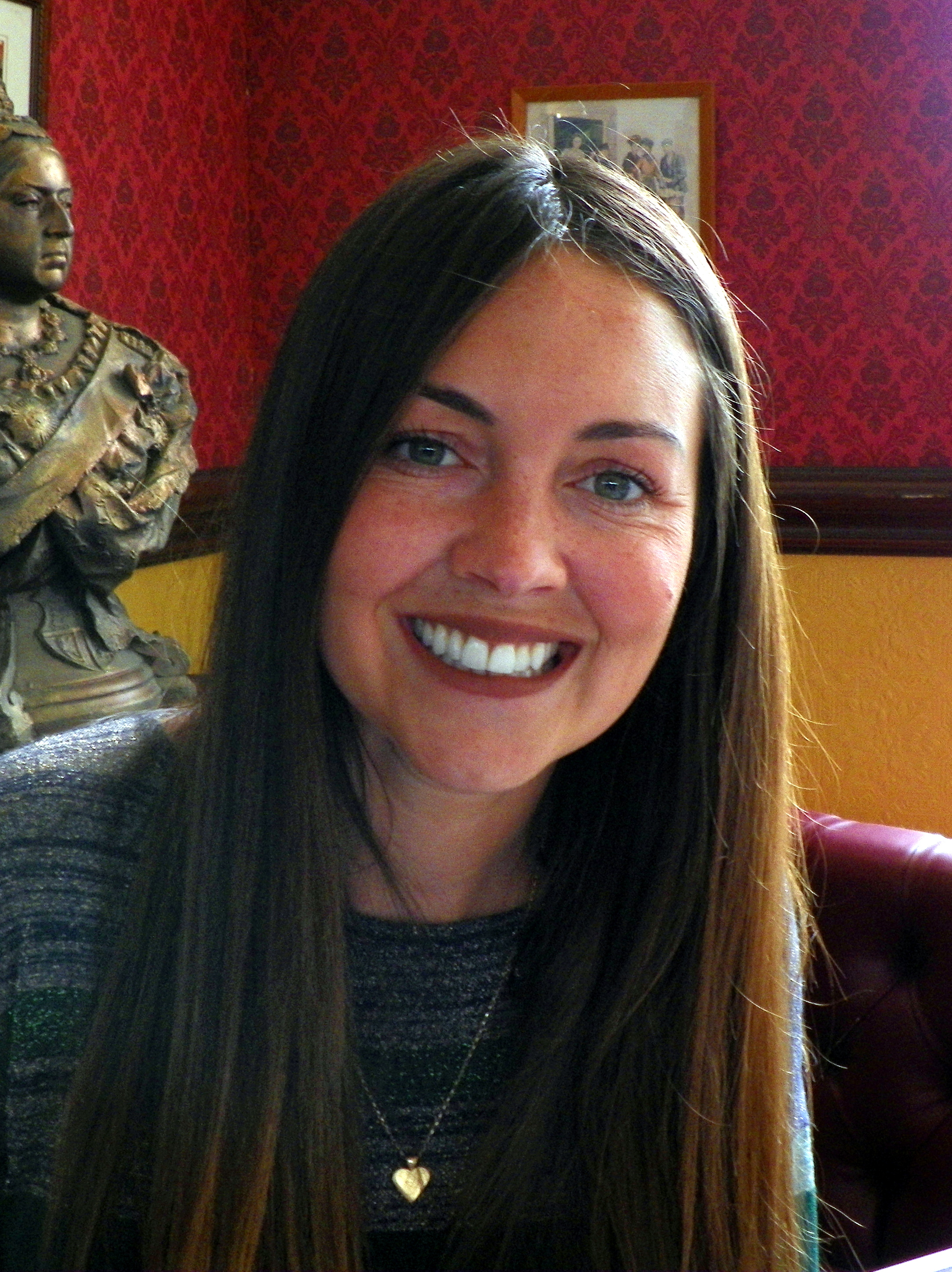
Louisa Lytton (Ruby Allen) and Lacey Turner (Stacey Fowler, pictured) received a positive response from critics and viewers for their performances in the episode.

"Episode 5820" received critical acclaim following its broadcast, with television critics and viewers saying it had "broken new ground". Kimberly Bond of Radio Times called it a "brave and ambitious edition". The Independent's Sabrina Barr reported on the positive response from viewers, who described it as one of the show's "best" ever episodes. Barr also said, "The performances of Lacey Turner as Stacey Slater and Lytton as Ruby have been heavily praised by EastEnders viewers, as has the impactful writing of the dialogue." Justin Harp of Digital Spy also rounded up various responses from viewers, concluding "Louisa Lytton and Lacey Turner specifically received huge praise, as did the writers for having Denise Fox (Diane Parish) plainly state to the men in the pub and viewers watching that 'silence isn't a yes'".

Harp's colleague Sophie Dainty later stated: "Authentic, unflinching, and thoroughly thought-provoking, EastEnders broke new ground with tonight's special episode (November 29) which centred around Ruby Allen's rape storyline." Dainty said the setting and sole focus on one storyline allowed "the powerful and important nature of the story to take centre stage instead." She also found the debate amongst the characters to be "seamless and organic", feeling that it felt like a discussion that could be taking place between the audience's family and friends. Dainty thought there were uncomfortable moments throughout the episode, and she disliked the slow-motion effect at the beginning and end, feeling that it was "a little unnecessary". But she added that "it's an episode we won't be forgetting in a while."

In an opinion piece for the Metro, Katie Baillie opened by saying "Tonight's episode all about consent is perhaps one of the most poignant in the history of EastEnders." Baillie praised the style of the episode, writing "The show is nothing short of spectacular, with the use of different cinematographic techniques such as one-shots to bring home the drama and heighten emotions. The episode highlights the many differing opinions on consent, from the polarised to the murky middle ground, and viewers won't be able to help but stop and think about their own stances even if they were sure as a rock before." Baillie also said there were "some incredible one liners" and she thought Lytton deserved recognition for her performance, saying "She is brilliant throughout and it doesn't look like she's acting for a second. She's there, living the moment, reliving the torment, feeling the pain. I hope that at next year's soap awards Louisa is there leading the nominations."

Gary Gillatt and Laura-Jayne Tyler of Inside Soap singled out writer Anya Reiss for her script. They called the episode "sensational", and wrote "It was a thing of wonder with every character responding perfectly as themselves, and will have sparked vital discussion in living rooms across the country." The episode received a nomination for Best Single Episode at the 2019 British Soap Awards. It was also longlisted for Best Show-Stopper at the 2019 Inside Soap Awards.
