= Shannon Tarbet =

British actress

- Born: 27 October 1991 (age 35); Brighton, East Sussex, England
- Occupation: Actress
- Years active: 2010–present

Shannon Tarbet (born 27 October 1991) is a British actress, on stage, radio, television, with roles on Genius and on Rellik (2017) and on Killing Eve (2019), and films, with roles in Love Is Blind (2019) and Love Sarah (2020).

== Early life ==
Tarbet was born and lived her early years in Brighton, East Sussex, and attended Greenfields School in Forest Row. Tarbet studied acting at the K-Bis Theatre School in Brighton. From there, Tarbet was working in telesales attempting to save enough money to apply for drama school, when she successfully auditioned at the Royal Court Theatre, igniting her acting career.

== Career ==
Tarbet made her professional stage debut in 2010 as Delilah Evans in the Anya Reiss play Spur of the Moment at the Royal Court Theatre, for which, she was shortlisted for the Evening Standard Outstanding Newcomer in 2010. In 2011, she made a guest appearance in the BBC's Inspector George Gently. In 2012, she appeared as Jane Clairmont in Helen Edmundson's play, Mary Shelley. The same year, Tarbet played a voice role in Nell Leyshon's radio drama Jess's Story, for Children in need, aired on BBC Radio 4 in November 2012, concerning students with mental health issues.

In 2013, Tarbet appeared in the short film Woodland and won the best actor award at the Underwire Film Festival. Tarbet was nominated for the 2015 Offie for best female for her performance the play, The Edge of our Bodies at the Gate Theatre (London). In 2017, Tarbet starred alongside Geoffrey Rush in the Ron Howard directed Genius. The same year Tarbet played sixteen year-old Hannah Markham in the BBC drama TV series Rellik.

In 2019, Tarbet starred alongside Matthew Broderick in the dark comedy-drama film Love is Blind.

In 2020, Tarbet played the leading role of Clarissa in Love Sarah, directed by Eliza Schroeder.

In 2022, Tarbet starred in an interactive film, the first of its kind in Europe, The Gallery

== Stage performances ==
Year	Production	Character	Venue	Notes/ Reference
2010	Spur of the Moment	Delilah Evans	Royal Court Theatre	
2011	Mogadishu	Becky	Royal Exchange, Manchester	
2012	Mary Shelley	Jane Clairmont	Shared Experience	Play by Helen Edmundson

== Filmography ==
=== Film ===
Year	Title	Character	Notes/reference
2013	Woodland	Short Film	
2013	A Promise	Anna	
2017	The Choke (Short)	Alana	
2017	Beast	Polly	
2018	Dead Birds (Short)	Elsa	
2018	Helena (Short)	Alice	
2018	Colette	Meg	
2019	Martha (Short)	Martha	
2019	Love Is Blind	Bess Krafft	
2020	Love Sarah	Clarissa	
2022	The Gallery (interactive film)	?	

=== Television ===
Year	Title	Character	Notes/reference
2011	Inspector George Gently	Mary Claverton	Gently Upside Down Series 4 episode 1
2011	Silk	Amy	1 episode (1.5)
2011	Monroe	Natasha	1 episode (1.4)
2011	Lewis	Samantha Coyle	1 episode - Old, Unhappy, Far Off
2015	River	Erin Fielding	Series 1, Episodes 1 and 6
2015	Virtuoso	Ina	TV film
2017	Genius	Marie Winteler	3 episodes
2017	Rellik	Hannah Markham	6 episodes
2019	Killing Eve	Amber Peel	2 episodes - I Hope You Like Missionary! and Nice and Neat
2024	Hotel Portofino	Eleanor 'Nellie' Gibson-White	

== Awards and nominations ==
Year	Award	Category	Nominated work	Result	Ref.
2010	Evening Standard Theatre Awards	Milton Shulman Award for Outstanding Newcomer	Spur of the Moment Royal Court Theatre	Nominated	
2011	Manchester Theatre Awards	Best Actress in a supporting role	Mogadishu, Royal Exchange, Manchester	Won	
2013	Underwire Film Festival	Actor Award	Woodland (Short film)	Won	
2015	The Offies	Best Female	The Edge of our Bodies at the Gate Theatre.	Nominated	
