= Celia Imrie =

English actress (born 1952)

Celia Imrie CBE
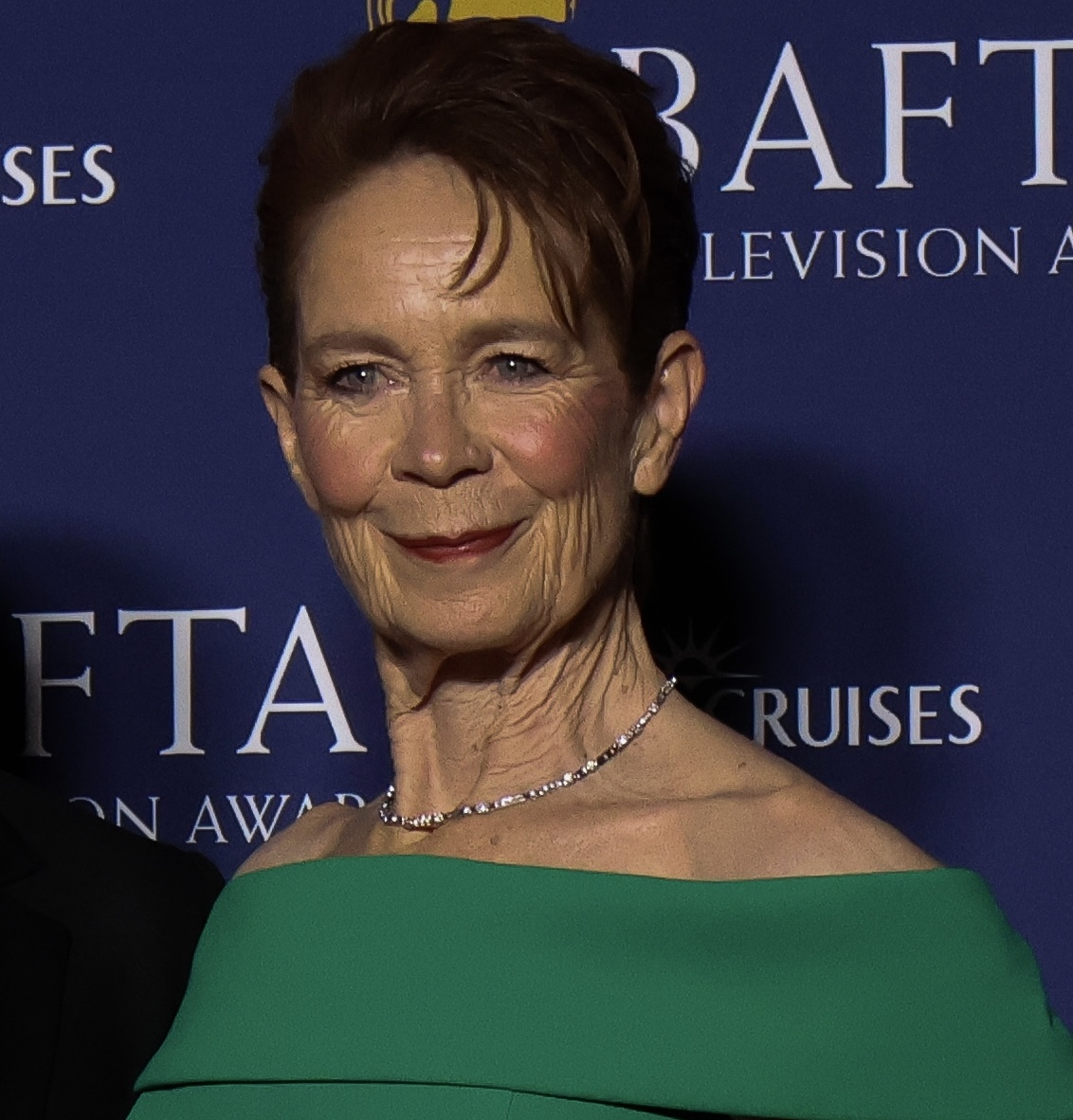
- Imrie at the 2026 BAFTA Television Awards
- Born: Celia Diana Savile Imrie; 15 July 1952 (age 74); Guildford, Surrey, England
- Education: Guildford High School; Guildford School of Acting
- Occupation: Actress
- Years active: 1973–present
- Children: Angus Imrie

Celia Diana Savile Imrie (born 15 July 1952) is an English actress, often appearing in comic roles.

Imrie is best known for film roles including the Bridget Jones series (2001, 2004, 2016, 2025), Calendar Girls (2003), Nanny McPhee (2005), St Trinian's (2007), The Best Exotic Marigold Hotel (2011), The Second Best Exotic Marigold Hotel (2015), A Cure for Wellness (2016), Mamma Mia! Here We Go Again (2018), and The Thursday Murder Club (2025).

Imrie appeared in the FX series Better Things (2016–2022), the Netflix series The Diplomat (2023–present) and the first series of The Celebrity Traitors (2025) on BBC One. She is also known for her frequent collaborations with the comedian and actress Victoria Wood. In 2006, she won an Olivier Award for Best Performance in a Supporting Role in a Musical in Acorn Antiques: The Musical!.

== Early life and education ==
Celia Diana Savile Imrie was born on 15 July 1952 in Guildford, Surrey, the fourth of five children of Dr. David Andrew Imrie, a radiologist from Glasgow, Scotland, and Diana Elizabeth Imrie, née Cator. Her mother was a granddaughter of Sir John Ralph Blois, 8th Baronet, from an old Suffolk family. Imrie was educated at Guildford High School, an independent school for girls in her home town of Guildford, followed by the Guildford School of Acting.

At the age of 14 she was admitted to St Thomas' Hospital due to an eating disorder and placed under the care of the controversial psychiatrist William Sargant. She spoke about this period in her own book The Happy Hoofer and in Jon Stock's The Sleep Room; and has described his treatment as "cruel" and "barbaric", and said it contributed nothing to her recovery.

== Career ==
=== Film ===
Imrie's film credits include the mischievous Mrs. Selma Quickly in Nanny McPhee, Iris du Pré in Hilary and Jackie, Homily Clock in the 1997 film The Borrowers, as well as roles in House of Whipcord, Bridget Jones's Diary, Calendar Girls, Highlander and Mary Shelley's Frankenstein. Imrie played Fighter Pilot Bravo 5 in Star Wars: Episode I – The Phantom Menace, Matron in St Trinian's (2007), Claudia Bing in Absolutely Fabulous: The Movie (2016), Victoria Watkins in A Cure for Wellness (2016), Bif in Finding Your Feet (2017), Vice-Chancellor in Mamma Mia! Here We Go Again (2018), Mimi in Love Sarah (2020), Imelda in Good Grief (2024) and Joyce in The Thursday Murder Club (2025).

=== Television ===
Imrie's television credits include the original 1970s series of Upstairs, Downstairs; Bergerac; The Nightmare Man; Oranges are not the only Fruit; Casualty; Absolutely Fabulous; Still Game and The Darling Buds of May. She also played Vera in A Dark-Adapted Eye (1994) by Ruth Rendell.

Imrie first worked with Victoria Wood in the 1980s on Victoria Wood: As Seen on TV, which included the popular sketch Acorn Antiques. In 1994, she reunited with Wood in the television film Pat and Margaret, and later appeared in Dinnerladies from 1998 to 1999.

Imrie's other roles include Still Game, Cloud Howe, Taggart, and Blue Black Permanent (1992).

In 2000, Imrie played Lady Gertrude in Gormenghast, while, in 2001, she was in Love in a Cold Climate with Alan Bates. In 2002, she played Mrs Violet Pearman to Albert Finney's Churchill in The Gathering Storm. She appeared in the BBC television drama Mr. Harvey Lights a Candle (2005), appeared opposite Nicholas Lyndhurst in the BBC sitcom After You've Gone (2007–2008), opposite Stephen Fry in the ITV1 drama Kingdom, and with Judi Dench in Cranford. In 2013, she guest-starred in the BBC's Doctor Who, playing the villainous Miss Kizlet in "The Bells of Saint John". In May 2016, she made her US television debut in the DC action-adventure series Legends of Tomorrow. In September 2016 she began starring as Phyllis in the FX series Better Things.

In 2025, Imrie appeared as a contestant on the first series of The Celebrity Traitors. Her nervous fart, while locked in a wooden cabin with the other celebrities in episode 3, was described as the "TV moment of the year". Imrie competed the game as a faithful before eventually being "murdered" in plain sight by traitor Alan Carr in episode 8.

=== Theatre ===
After appearing as a chorus girl in many pantomimes, in 1975 Imrie got a job as an Assistant Stage Manager and understudy in the Royal Shakespeare Company with Glenda Jackson playing Hedda Gabler, directed by Trevor Nunn, on a world tour. Also in the company at that time were Patrick Stewart, Timothy West, Peter Eyre, Pam St Clement, Jennie Linden and Fidelis Morgan.

In 1979, Imrie played in her first revue, Performing Ceals with Celia Foxe, which first opened at The Bonne Crepe and played at various venues in London ending up in 1980 at The Comic Strip. Other plays include Seduced at the Royal Court Theatre, and Heaven and Hell at the Traverse Theatre. Imrie appeared with the company in the 1979, 1981 and 1983 seasons at the celebrated Citizens Theatre in Glasgow. In 1984 she played in Alfie with Adam Faith at the Liverpool Playhouse in a production directed by Alan Parker. In 1991 she appeared in The Sea with Dame Judi Dench at the National Theatre in London. In 2005, after a successful run at the King's Head Theatre, her one woman play Unsuspecting Susan written by Stewart Permutt transferred to 59E59 Theaters in New York. In 2009 she appeared in Plague Over England in the West End, while in the same year she appeared in the world premiere of Robin Soans's Mixed Up North, directed by Max Stafford-Clark. In 2010, she appeared alongside Robin Soans in a production of Sheridan's The Rivals.

In 2005, Imrie won the Laurence Olivier Award for Best Supporting Actress in Acorn Antiques: The Musical! playing Miss Babs. In 1995 she played in The Hothouse at the Chichester Festival Theatre with Harold Pinter, with the production after transferring to the West End. In 1990 she appeared in Hangover Square at the Lyric Hammersmith with Dudley Sutton, in Drama at Inish (2011) at the Finborough Theatre with Paul O'Grady, and in her cabaret Laughing Matters – all adapted and directed by Fidelis Morgan.

In 2010, Imrie played in Hay Fever, and during the 2011–2012 season she appeared in Noises Off at The Old Vic and the West End, for which performance she was nominated for an Olivier Award. In 2016 Imrie re-united with Glenda Jackson after 41 years since their RSC world tour, playing a "grimly determined Goneril" in King Lear at The Old Vic.

Imrie narrated during the ceremonial event held to mark the 75th anniversary of D-day at Portsmouth in 2019.

=== Radio ===
Imrie's radio work includes parts in BBC Radio 4's No Commitments and Bleak Expectations. In early 2007, she narrated the book Arabella, broadcast over two weeks as the Book at Bedtime. She was the guest on Desert Island Discs on BBC Radio 4 on 13 February 2011.

Imrie appeared on BBC Radio 4's The Museum of Curiosity in October 2019. Her hypothetical donation to this imaginary museum was "A half-burnt candle".

For Big Finish Productions, Imrie has played numerous roles including Dr Kessika Miles in the Doctor Who epic Hooklight in 2025, opposite Peter Davison. Before that, she had voiced Madame Tissot in 2016 Doctor Who story Gallery of Ghouls opposite Tom Baker. In the same year, she played Livia in the Gallifrey spin-off series story Enemy Lines. Earlier, in 2013, in another Doctor Who spin-off series entitled Counter Measures, a spin-off of the 1988 television episode Remembrance of the Daleks, she played Dr Elizabeth Bradley in the episode The Fifth Axis.

Imrie's non-Doctor Who Big Finish roles include being co-lead in the Big Finish Original murder mystery series Shilling and Sixpence. She played Clementina Quentinbloom in their production of Jeremiah Bourne in Time. She was also one of the actors to play Number Two in the Big Finish adaptation of The Prisoner.

=== Books ===
Imrie's debut novel Not Quite Nice was published by Bloomsbury in 2015, had six weeks in The Sunday Times Top Ten, was cited by The Times as a 'delicious piece of entertainment', and also reached number 5 in the Apple ibook chart and 8 in Amazon's book chart. Her second novel, Nice Work (If You Can Get It), was published in 2016; and her third, Sail Away, was published in February 2018. Her next work, A Nice Cup of Tea, was published in 2019. Her fifth novel, Orphans of the Storm, was published in 2021.

- The Happy Hoofer (2011), Hodder & Stoughton, ISBN 978-1444709278
- Not Quite Nice (2015), Bloomsbury Publishing, ISBN 978-1632860323
- Nice Work (If You Can Get It) (2016), Bloomsbury Publishing, ISBN 978-1408876909
- Sail Away (2018), Bloomsbury Publishing, ISBN 978-1408883235
- A Nice Cup of Tea (2019), Bloomsbury Publishing. ISBN 978-1408883266
- Orphans of the Storm (2021), Bloomsbury Publishing. ISBN 978-1526614896
- Meet Me At Rainbow Corner (2024), Bloomsbury Publishing. ISBN 978-1526616357

=== Mamma Mia! Here We Go Again ===
As part of the cast of the 2018 film Mamma Mia! Here We Go Again, Imrie achieved her first UK Top 40 single alongside Lily James with a cover of the ABBA song "When I Kissed the Teacher", which reached number 40 in August 2018.

== Personal life ==
Imrie lives in London and in Nice, France. She has a son, Angus Imrie, born in 1994, with the actor Benjamin Whitrow. Angus appears as her on-screen son in Kingdom (2007–2009) and has acted in other productions, having studied drama and performance at the University of Warwick.

In July 2005, Imrie suffered a pulmonary embolism and was hospitalised for two weeks.

Imrie was featured in the BBC genealogy series Who Do You Think You Are? in October 2012 and discovered that an ancestor on her mother's side was William, Lord Russell, a Whig parliamentarian executed for treason in 1683, after being found guilty of conspiring against Charles II. Imrie's great-great uncle, William Imrie, was a founder of the White Star Line. Imrie is a ten-times-great granddaughter of the infamous Frances Carr, Countess of Somerset.

In 2013, Imrie was awarded an honorary doctorate by the University of Winchester.

== Filmography ==
=== Film ===
Key
| † | Denotes films that have not yet been released |

| Year | Title | Role | Notes |
|---|---|---|---|
| 1973 | Assassin | Stacy's Secretary | |
| 1974 | House of Whipcord | Barbara | |
| 1978 | Death on the Nile | Maid | Uncredited |
| 1983 | The Wicked Lady | Servant at Inn | |
| 1986 | Highlander | Kate | |
| 1992 | Blue Black Permanent | Barbara Thorburn | |
| 1994 | Mary Shelley's Frankenstein | Mrs. Moritz | |
| 1995 | In the Bleak Midwinter | Fadge | |
| 1997 | The Borrowers | Homily Clock | |
| 1998 | Hilary and Jackie | Iris Du Pré | |
| 1998 | Hiccup | Judy | Short |
| 1999 | Star Wars: Episode I – The Phantom Menace | Fighter Pilot Bravo 5 | |
| 2001 | Bridget Jones's Diary | Una Alconbury | |
| 2001 | Lucky Break | Amy Chamberlain | |
| 2001 | Revelation | Harriet Martel | |
| 2002 | Thunderpants | Miss Rapier | |
| 2002 | Heartlands | Sonja | |
| 2003 | Calendar Girls | Celia | |
| 2003 | Out of Bounds | Imogen Reed | |
| 2004 | Wimbledon | Lydice Kenwood | |
| 2004 | Bridget Jones: The Edge of Reason | Una Alconbury | |
| 2005 | Wah-Wah | Lady Riva Hardwick | |
| 2005 | Imagine Me & You | Tessa | |
| 2005 | Nanny McPhee | Mrs Quickly | |
| 2007 | St Trinian's | Matron | |
| 2009 | St Trinian's 2: The Legend of Fritton's Gold | Matron | |
| 2010 | You Will Meet a Tall Dark Stranger | Enid Wicklow | |
| 2010 | The Man Who Married Himself | Mother | Short |
| 2011 | The Best Exotic Marigold Hotel | Madge Hardcastle | |
| 2011 | My Angel | The Librarian | |
| 2012 | Acts of Godfrey | Helen McGann | |
| 2013 | The Love Punch | Pen | |
| 2014 | What We Did on Our Holiday | Agnes Chisolm | |
| 2014 | Nativity 3: Dude, Where's My Donkey? | Clara Keen | |
| 2015 | The Second Best Exotic Marigold Hotel | Madge Hardcastle | |
| 2015 | Molly Moon and the Incredible Book of Hypnotism | Edna the Cook | |
| 2016 | Year by the Sea | Erikson | |
| 2016 | Absolutely Fabulous: The Movie | Claudia Bing | |
| 2016 | Bridget Jones's Baby | Una Alconbury | |
| 2016 | A Cure for Wellness | Victoria Watkins | |
| 2017 | Monster Family | Cheyenne | Voice role |
| 2017 | Finding Your Feet | Bif | |
| 2018 | Malevolent | Mrs Green | |
| 2018 | Mamma Mia! Here We Go Again | Vice Chancellor | |
| 2018 | Nativity Rocks! This Ain’t No Silent Night | Mrs. Keen | |
| 2020 | Love Sarah | Mimi | |
| 2022 | Fifty-Four Days | Gloria | Short |
| 2023 | Mummies | Mother June Carnaby | Voice role |
| 2023 | Love Again | Gina Valentine | |
| 2023 | Good Grief | Imelda | |
| 2025 | Bridget Jones: Mad About the Boy | Una Alconbury | |
| 2025 | The Thursday Murder Club | Joyce Meadowcroft | |
| 2026 | Merry Christmas Aubrey Flint | Gloria Lynn | |

=== Television ===
| Year | Title | Role | Notes |
|---|---|---|---|
| 1974 | Upstairs, Downstairs | Jenny | "If You Were the Only Girl in the World", "Missing Believed Killed" |
| 1979 | To the Manor Born | Polly | "A Touch of Class" |
| 1980 | Shoestring | Sheila Johnson | "The Dangerous Game" |
| 1980 | To the Manor Born | Surgery Receptionist | "Vive Le Sport" |
| 1981 | The Nightmare Man | Fiona Patterson | |
| 1981 | 81 Take 2 | | TV film |
| 1982 | Cloud Howe | Else Queen | |
| 1983 | Bergerac | Marianne Bellshade | |
| 1985–1987 | Victoria Wood: As Seen on TV | Various characters | |
| 1988 | Taggart | Helen Lomax | "Root of Evil" |
| 1988–1989 | The New Statesman | Hilary | "Alan B'Stard Closes Down the BBC", "May the Best Man Win" |
| 1989 | Murder by Moonlight | Patsy Diehl | TV film |
| 1989 | Victoria Wood | Carol | "We'd Quite Like to Apologise" |
| 1989 | Victoria Wood | Jackie | "Val De Ree (Ha Ha Ha Ha Ha)" |
| 1989 | Victoria Wood | Julia / Spoof TV Ad actress | "Staying In" |
| 1990 | Oranges Are Not the Only Fruit | Miss Jewsbury | |
| 1990 | The World of Eddie Weary | Birdie | TV film |
| 1990 | Old Flames | Davina Wright / Hopjoy | |
| 1990 | 102 Boulevard Haussmann | Mme Massis | |
| 1991 | Lovejoy | Lady Felicity Carey-Holden | "The Italian Venus" |
| 1991 | The Darling Buds of May | Corinne Perigo | "When the Green Woods Laugh (Parts 1 & 2)" |
| 1991 | All Good Things | Rachel Bromley | |
| 1991 | Stay Lucky | Julie Vernon | "The Food of Love" |
| 1992 | Victoria Wood's All Day Breakfast | Various characters | |
| 1992 | Van der Valk | Marijke Dekker | "Still Waters" |
| 1993 | Bonjour la Classe | Mrs Botney | "Red Card" |
| 1993 | The Riff Raff Element | Joanna Tundish | |
| 1993 | A Question of Guilt | Sissy Malton | TV film |
| 1994 | A Dark Adapted Eye | Vera Hillyard | TV film |
| 1994 | Pat and Margaret | Claire | |
| 1994 | The Return of the Native | Susan Nunsuch | TV film |
| 1995–2001 | Absolutely Fabulous | Claudia Bing | "Jealous", "Menopause" |
| 1995 | Casualty | Elizabeth Clayton | "Learning Curve" |
| 1995–1996 | Blackhearts in Battersea | Duchess of Battersea | |
| 1996 | The Writing on the Wall | Kirsty | TV film |
| 1997 | Hospital! | Sister Muriel | TV film |
| 1997 | Wokenwell | June Bonney | |
| 1997 | Into the Blue | Nadine Cunningham | |
| 1997 | The History of Tom Jones, a Foundling | Mrs Miller | |
| 1997 | The Canterville Ghost | Lucy Otis | TV film |
| 1997 | Mr. White Goes to Westminster | Victoria Madison | TV film |
| 1998 | Duck Patrol | Mrs Calloway | "River Rage" |
| 1998–2000 | dinnerladies | Philippa Moorcroft | |
| 1999 | Wetty Hainthropp Investigates | Nightclub owner | TV Short |
| 1999 | Hilltop Hospital | Surgeon Sally | Voice role |
| 1999 | A Christmas Carol | Mrs Bennett | TV film |
| 2000 | Gormenghast | Lady Gertrude | |
| 2000 | Dalziel and Pascoe | Christina Chance | "Above the Law" |
| 2000 | Victoria Wood with All the Trimmings | Various characters | |
| 2001 | Love in a Cold Climate | Aunt Sadie | |
| 2001 | Baddiel's Syndrome | Ruth Proudhon | "Inventions Now" |
| 2001 | Station Jim | Miss Frazier | TV film |
| 2001 | Midsomer Murders | Louise August | "Dark Autumn" |
| 2001 | Randall & Hopkirk | Professor McKern | "Revenge of the Bog People" |
| 2002 | Heartbeat | Sylvia Langley | "The Shoot" |
| 2002 | The Gathering Storm | Violet Pearman | TV film |
| 2002 | Sparkhouse | Kate Lawton | |
| 2002 | A Is for Acid | Rose Henderson | TV film |
| 2002 | Daniel Deronda | Mrs Meyrick | |
| 2002 | Doctor Zhivago | Anna Gromyko | |
| 2003 | The Planman | Gail Forrester | TV film |
| 2003 | Still Game | Mrs Begg | "Wummin'" |
| 2004 | Jonathan Creek | Thelma Bailey | "Gorgons Wood" |
| 2004 | Doc Martin | Susan Brading | "Going Bodmin" |
| 2004 | Agatha Christie's Marple | Madame Joilet | "4:50 from Paddington" |
| 2005 | Mr. Harvey Lights a Candle | Miss Davies | TV film |
| 2006 | Agatha Christie's Poirot | 'Aunt' Kathy Cloade | "Taken at the Flood" |
| 2006 | The Lavender List | Mary Wilson | TV film |
| 2006 | Where the Heart Is | Gaynor Whiteside | "Walk of Faith" |
| 2007–2008 | After You've Gone | Diana | Main role; 25 episodes |
| 2007–2009 | Kingdom | Gloria Millington | 18 episodes |
| 2009 | Cranford | Lady Glenmire | "Christmas Special" |
| 2010 | The Road to Coronation Street | Doris Speed | TV film |
| 2011 | The Bleak Old Shop of Stuff | Miss Christmasham | 1 episode |
| 2012 | Hacks | Tabby | TV film |
| 2012 | Titanic | Grace Rushton | 4 episodes |
| 2012 | Lewis | Michelle Marber | "The Soul of Genius" |
| 2013 | Doctor Who | Miss Kizlet | "The Bells of Saint John" |
| 2013 | Love and Marriage | Rowan Holdaway | 6 episodes |
| 2014 | Blandings | Charlotte | 1 episode |
| 2014 | Our Zoo | Lady Daphne Goodwin | 1 episode |
| 2015 | Vicious | Lillian Haverfield-Wickham | 1 episode |
| 2016 | Legends of Tomorrow | Mary Xavier | 1 episode |
| 2016–2022 | Better Things | Phyllis "Phil" Darby | Main role; 50 episodes |
| 2018 | Patrick Melrose | Kettle | 2 episodes |
| 2018 | Hang Ups | Maggie Pitt | 4 episodes |
| 2020 | Keeping Faith | Rose Fairchild | Series 3; Main role |
| 2023–present | The Diplomat | Margaret "Meg" Roylin | Recurring role |
| 2024 | A Ghost Story for Christmas | Edith Nesbit | Episode 18: "Woman of Stone" |
| 2025 | The Celebrity Traitors | Herself | Contestant; 7th Place; series 1 |
| 2026–present | War | Joy "Budgie" Budge | 6 episodes |
| TBA | Tomb Raider | Francine | Filming |

== Theatre ==
- 1976: Now Here's a Funny Thing
- 1976: Sherlock Holmes
- 1976: The Adventures of Alice
- 1977: Henry V
- 1977: Love's Labour's Lost
- 1977: The Boyfriend
- 1978: As You Like It
- 1978: Cabaret
- 1978: Macbeth
- 1978: 'Tis Pity She's a Whore
- 1979: The Good Humoured Ladies
- 1979: Pygmalion
- 1980: Seduced
- 1981: Heaven and Hell
- 1981: A Waste of Time
- 1982: Puntila and Matti, Master and Servant
- 1982: Puss in Boots
- 1982: Philosophy of the Boudoir
- 1982: The Screens
- 1983: Arms and the Man
- 1983: Custom of the Country
- 1983: The Merchant of Venice
- 1983: Sirocco
- 1983: Webster
- 1984: Alfie
- 1984: The Merchant of Venice
- 1984: When I Was a Girl I Used to Scream and Shout
- 1985: Particular Friendships
- 1985: The Philanthropist
- 1986: Last Waltz
- 1987: School For Wives
- 1987: Yerma
- 1988: Doctor Angelus
- 1988: The Madwoman of Chaillot
- 1990: In Pursuit of the English
- 1990: Hangover Square
- 1990: No One Sees the Video
- 1991: The Sea
- 1995: The Hothouse
- 1996: Habeas Corpus
- 1997: Dona Rosita the Spinster
- 1998: The School for Scandal
- 2003: The Way of the World
- 2003: Unsuspecting Susan
- 2005: Acorn Antiques: The Musical!
- 2005: Unsuspecting Susan
- 2009: Plague Over England
- 2009: Mixed Up North
- 2010: The Rivals
- 2010: Polar Bears
- 2010: Hay Fever
- 2011: Drama at Inish
- 2011–2012: Noises Off
- 2016: King Lear
- 2018–2019: Party Time and Celebration
- 2025: Backstroke

== Awards and honours ==
- 1992: The Clarence Derwent Award for Best Supporting Actress in The Sea
- 2006: Olivier Award for Best Performance in a Supporting Role in a Musical in Acorn Antiques:The Musical!
- 2017: UK WFTV (Women in Film and Television) Award for the EON Productions Lifetime Achievement

Imrie was appointed Commander of the Order of the British Empire (CBE) in the 2023 Birthday Honours for services to drama.
