= The Lottery (TV series) =

- Genre: Post-apocalyptic; Conspiracy thriller
- Created by: Timothy J. Sexton
- Starring: Marley Shelton; Michael Graziadei; Athena Karkanis; David Alpay; Shelley Conn; Yul Vazquez; Martin Donovan
- Composer: Jeff Cardoni
- Country of origin: United States
- Original language: English
- No. of seasons: 1
- No. of episodes: 10

Production
- Executive producers: Dawn Olmstead; Rick Eid; Timothy J. Sexton; Danny Cannon ("Pilot")
- Producers: Kate Fenske ("Pilot"); Jane Bartelme ("Pilot"); Ken Topolsky (episodes 2–10)
- Production locations: Montreal, Quebec, Canada
- Cinematography: David Stockton ("Pilot"); Bernard Couture (episodes 2–10)
- Running time: 39–42 minutes
- Production companies: Warner Horizon Television; Grady Twins Productions

Original release
- Network: Lifetime
- Release: July 20 – September 28, 2014

The Lottery is an American post-apocalyptic drama television series that aired on Lifetime from July 20 through September 28, 2014. The series is set in a dystopian future when women have stopped having children due to an infertility pandemic. It stars Marley Shelton, Michael Graziadei, Athena Karkanis, David Alpay, Shelley Conn, Yul Vazquez and Martin Donovan.

On October 17, 2014, Lifetime cancelled The Lottery after one season.

== Synopsis ==
It is the year 2025, and no children have been born on Earth since 2019 due to an infertility pandemic that first became noticeable in 2016. Dr. Alison Lennon and her assistant, Dr. James Lynch, make a breakthrough in their lab work for the Department of Humanity (DOH), and are able to successfully fertilize eggs to create 100 viable human embryos. Darius Hayes, Director of the DOH, strongly believes that the embryos should immediately become property of the U.S. government. But the President of the United States, Thomas Westwood, is fighting sagging poll numbers and sides with his chief of staff, Vanessa Keller, who suggests they hold a public lottery to select 100 women who will carry the embryos to term. The DOH is also looking to control all young children in the country, which includes Elvis Walker, the six-year-old son of Kyle Walker. Meanwhile, an anti-government group called the Second of May Resistance, or "MayTwos", is also trying to seize control of the embryos for its own purposes. In researching the egg and sperm donors that produced the embryos, Alison and James discover a common bond that leads them to uncover the cause of the global infertility crisis. The battle to affect the future of the human race, along with the need to keep secrets buried, becomes a life-and-death struggle, with many paying the ultimate price.

== Cast and characters ==
=== Main cast ===
- Marley Shelton as Dr. Alison Lennon
- Michael Graziadei as Kyle Walker, father of Elvis
- Athena Karkanis as Chief of Staff Vanessa Keller
- David Alpay as Dr. James Lynch, Alison's colleague and lab assistant
- Shelley Conn as Gabrielle Westwood, the First Lady of the United States
- Yul Vazquez as President Thomas Westwood, the President of the United States
- Martin Donovan as Darius Hayes, the Director of the U.S. Fertility Commission and the head of the Department of Humanity (DOH)

=== Recurring cast ===
- J. August Richards as Deputy Secretary of State Nathan Mitchell
- Jesse Filkow as Elvis Walker, Kyle's son and one of the last six children born in 2019
- Rex Linn as General Alan Langdon, the Chairman of the Joint Chiefs
- Megan Park as Rose, Darius' daughter
- Karissa Lee Staples as Perry Sommers, a Lottery finalist
- Christiana Leucas as Angela Maria Perez, a Lottery finalist
- Ernie Hudson as Randall Mitchell, a former Attorney General and Nathan's father
- Arturo del Puerto as Rojas, the leader of the MayTwos, the Second of May Resistance
- Steven Culp as Dan Melrose, the Vice President of the United States

== Production ==
On September 16, 2013, Lifetime placed a pilot order on The Lottery. On November 4, 2013, Michael Graziadei, Lesley-Ann Brandt and Louise Lombard were cast as regulars. On November 21, 2013, Marley Shelton signed on to star in the pilot episode. David Alpay later was cast as her character's assistant. On December 2, 2013, Martin Donovan was cast as a regular and Salli Richardson was cast in a recurring role as the first lady of the United States. On February 11, 2014, Lifetime officially green-lit The Lottery with a 10-episode series order.

The series filmed in Montreal, Quebec, Canada. After the pilot was picked up by Lifetime, several characters were recast. Lesley-Ann Brandt was reduced to recurring status, Athena Karkanis replaced Louise Lombard as Chief of Staff Vanessa Keller. Yul Vazquez was cast as President of the United States, and Shelley Conn replaced Salli Richardson in the role of First Lady of the United States.

== Episodes ==
No.	Title	Directed by	Written by	Original release date	U.S. viewers (millions)
1	"Pilot"	Danny Cannon	Timothy J. Sexton	July 20, 2014	1.08
In the year 2025, the world is facing a fertility crisis. A breakthrough has been made that will allow women to have children again, with 100 human embryos created. Alison, who has been leading the project, is removed and has her credentials taken away by Darius, prompting her to take one of the embryo eggs with her as she leaves. She tracks down the egg's donor, Brooke Ashton, who is then murdered by Darius after she decided to contact a lawyer. The murder is reported as a suicide. At the same time, news of the breakthrough leads Vanessa, Chief of Staff to president Westwood, to come up with the idea of holding a lottery that will choose 100 women to carry the embryos to term. Since 2019, only six children were born and are under the watchful eye of the U.S. government. When Kyle, the father of one of the six children, has his son Elvis taken away, he rescues him from the hospital where they are keeping him and becomes a fugitive. It is later revealed that he was the sperm donor for Brooke Ashton's egg.
2	"Rules of the Game"	Matt Earl Beesley	Rick Eid & Timothy J. Sexton	July 27, 2014	0.721
After Alison is arrested and tortured by Darius for stealing an embryo, Vanessa has her released and restores her job and clearance on the condition that she has to go along with the president's plan to promote the lottery to the public. Later, she is forced to give back the embryo. Alison soon discovers she can use this to her advantage when she finds a loophole in the deal. Alison also suspects Darius murdered Brooke and later discovers that the database of every donor listed has been removed. Meanwhile the president tells Darius that he will not use a military proposal that could jepordize the lottery, leading Darius to come up with a plan that would undermine the president's. Kyle finds refuge at a farm with an old friend and her daughter, another one of the six surviving children from 2019. Vanessa learns that Nathan Mitchell, who is also her boyfriend, has been kidnapped in China and is being held for a ransom of five embryos.
3	"Greater Good"	Karen Gaviola	Rick Eid & Timothy J. Sexton	August 3, 2014	0.823
As the Chinese terrorists vow to kill the diplomats within the next 24 hours if they don't receive the five embryos, Vanessa ends up getting a break from Nathan about the whereabouts, only to have the terrorists be one step ahead of them. To show their resolve, they kill one of the diplomats on camera and in view of Vanessa, but it is not Nathan. When the general suggests to Vanessa that they have no choice but cut their losses by killing the terrorist and hostages, she tells the president her decision and the Chinese police eventually kill them. One of the Chinese terrorist leaders survives and receives a call from Darius, who is revealed as the person behind the kidnapping. Darius uses a cellphone device to track and kill the terrorist. Alison, who just cut a public service ad for the lottery, hopes to track down Kyle. Kyle and Elvis are later captured by the Department of Humanity (DOH) as they try to escape to Quebec, but Kyle is bailed out of jail by Alison, who wants Kyle to provide her with a sperm sample. In return for the sample, Kyle demands that all charges against him be dropped and he wants Elvis returned to him. When the results prove inconclusive, Alison believes that Kyle can still conceive and attempts to find out why, only to discover through James that Kyle has the bubonic plague. Alison also finds herself the target of a stalker, but he is killed by a Secret Service agent right in front of her.
4	"Genie"	Tim Hunter	Kathy McCormick	August 10, 2014	0.576
Alison learns that the stalker had been offered $50 million by a Saudi Arabian group to kidnap her. Vanessa is distraught in the wake of Nathan's death, which is also taking a toll on one of her staff, Connor, who was a close friend of Nathan's. Connor starts drinking again, and later has a standoff with police while holding a gun. He is shot and killed just as he was about to tell Vanessa something about the hostage standoff. Alison gets a break when she discovers Kyle's plague virus was intentionally deactivated, leading her to believe he received it from a vaccination. She steals a hair brush from Brooke's home, and a DNA sample shows that Brooke also had the virus. She and James locate a doctor who treated both Kyle and Brooke two years before the infertility crisis began. They learn from the doctor's son that he was killed in a plane crash in 2015, shortly after Kyle and Brooke were vaccinated. James discovers that before the doctor died he collaborated with a zoologist. He and Alison theorize that the doctor saw the infertility crisis coming, and they suspect Darius had ties to the doctor's death. James apologizes to Alison for not believing her, and she asks him to join her. At the same time, Alison must deal with Kyle demanding to see Elvis. Kyle and Vanessa find Elvis at a Department of Humanity facility, where an aide tells Vanessa about plans to induce early puberty on some of the older children there, also saying the facility is likely to be the future home for the lottery winners. Vanessa tells Kyle that Elvis is okay, but advises him to get a lawyer and fight like hell at the custody hearing. Kyle's assigned lawyer is tied to the DOH, so he surmises he has little chance of winning. Kyle meets with his ex-wife, Elvis' mother, and she claims she has sobered up while also scolding Kyle for taking Elvis away. With the charges against him, Kyle thinks his ex has a better chance of winning custody of Elvis. Darius confronts James, telling him to notify him directly if any future fertility experiments are successful. With the lottery now underway, Vanessa is questioned by a television reporter about why the president's approval numbers have not improved since the lottery was announced, but she replies they're more concerned about the women and not the polls. It is later discovered that Darius is behind the plans to test Elvis and initiate the early puberty program, and he also tries to make it look like Connor was behind the hostage plot. Vanessa announces to the public that they will be able to vote on the lottery winners.
5	"Crystal City"	Steven A. Adelson	Peter Parnell	August 17, 2014	0.626
As the mystery surrounding Dr. Kessler's death and his connection to Darius deepens, Alison and James learn that Kessler had used an alias (Relssek, his name spelled backwards) to write his journals, which they see as valuable information. James is later attacked, he warns Alison that they should stick to science, fearing that she too could be a target. Vanessa visits Connor's surviving partner Charlie to discuss what they will say to the press about his death and to determine whether Connor was actually involved in the terrorist threats. Charlie, however, angrily believes that Vanessa and the government want to cover something up, suggesting that Connor knew about Darius' involvement in the hostage crisis. Vanessa later confronts Darius on this information, but Darius lies and says he never met Connor. Hours later, Vanessa meets with an agent, George, who gives her information on an apartment in Crystal City that Connor visited hours before the crisis. Vanessa observes while an agent goes to the apartment door, and sees a young woman greet him. Vanessa later returns to see Charlie, who has called the press to talk about Connor meeting Darius, but Vanessa convinces Charlie to lie to the press about Connor, saying it is for his and his daughter's own safety. At the custody hearing for Elvis, the judge hears testimony from Kyle and his ex-wife involving their rights as parents. Despite having a script that she was supposed to follow, the judge is about to favor Kyle but Darius threatens her. The judge then strips Kyle of his parental rights also deeming his ex an unfit mother, and makes Elvis a ward of the state. Kyle then gives Elvis a final hug goodbye, and heads to a bar to drink. Meanwhile, the lottery finalists arrive at the White House for a televised event to introduce them as potential mothers. Among the women chosen are Perry and Angela, who discover that their room is filled with cameras.
6	"Sleep Deprived"	Henry Bronchtein	Melissa Carter	August 24, 2014	0.620
The first day of the lottery, Gabrielle and Alison inform the finalists what to expect and state that the public will be watching them on television before voting on the final 100. The contestants are subject to strict rules, as witnessed by Angela and Perry, who must deal with nightly sleep deprivation tests. Gabrielle starts seeing the outspoken Perry as an interesting candidate. Vanessa later talks to Nathan's father Randall, revealing the relationship she had with his son and trying to convince him to find the truth about Nathan’s assassination. She surmises that having him dig around will look a lot less suspicious than her trying to uncover the truth. Later on, Randall, Vanessa, Darius and the president meet for a conversation in which Randall demands real answers about Nathan's death, suggesting that it was a cover-up. Darius however, feeds him a fabricated story that Nathan died trying to save the other diplomats, and Randall believes him. Convinced that Vanessa is getting too close to the truth, Darius decides the only way to solve the problem is to remove one major obstacle, the president. James suspects Kyle of selling them out to Darius, due to the beating he received which he finally reveals to Alison. Kyle finds himself being followed by Elliot, a member of the MayTwos. Elliot tells Kyle that the custody case was a setup and that all young children will eventually become property of DOH. Hours later, Kyle decides to seek out the group. The leader, Rojas, soon welcomes him into the fold. Meanwhile, Alison and James discover that a company called Heliogenics was funding Dr. Kessler’s research, after tracking a lead showing that Heliogenics rented a jet for secretive reasons. They discover that the plane crash was actually in Afghanistan, where infertility was first reported, not Greece, like Dr. Kessler’s obituary stated. They conclude that the plane was carrying the virus that created the crisis. Alison and James later inform Vanessa that the doomed jet belonged to the U.S. government and that Heliogenics was a front, meaning that the U.S. government likely started the infertility crisis.
7	"St. Michael"	Nathan Hope	Joe Halpin	September 7, 2014	0.654
Vanessa hears the evidence that Alison and James provide, and becomes convinced that Darius and the U.S. government were in on the fertility crisis from the beginning. The president gives instructions to the vice president, who is heading to a meeting with Darius and General Langdon, stating he does not want tanks or a noticeable military presence at the televised announcement of the lottery winners later that week. The vice president meets with Darius and Langdon, and becomes outraged when the head of the president's Secret Service detail won't reveal details of an escape route. Gabrielle reveals her interest in helping Perry, namely that she'd like to be the one to take care of the baby if Perry cannot. She rigs a psychology exam so that Perry can do well, but upon seeing that Angela is stressed out over a TV interview she just gave, Perry lets Angela take her seat at the test. Elsewhere, Kyle learns that the MayTwos have moles in the DOH building and can get Elvis out, but he also learns from Rojas that their help comes at a price. Alison and James meet with Kessler's son again, who at first denies knowing anything about his father's last days, but later tells James that his father kept handwritten logs in the family beach house on St. Michael's Island. Vanessa sees photographic evidence of the Vice President, Darius and Langdon meeting on their own, and warns Alison to tread carefully in her investigation of Kessler. Soon after, Alison learns that Kessler's son was found dead after being abducted. She warns James, who is on his way to the beach house. James goes anyway and discovers the logs. As he begins to take photos of the logs on his phone, he sees a black vehicle arrive with several men getting out of the vehicle. He manages to send the photographed pages from his phone just before he is shot by one of the men.
8	"Truth Be Told"	Norman Buckley	Michael Jones-Morales & Kari Drake	September 14, 2014	0.549
As James fights for his life, a concerned Alison tries to convince Vanessa that they have to get Darius for what he did. Vanessa says they need definite proof, also telling Alison that if Darius and the DOH did this, she is also in danger. The photos James sent to Alison's phone show up, and Alison shows Vanessa the Heliogenics research that Dr. Kessler was working on, it was initially a project to control overpopulation. The documents reveal Kessler had an enemy named Mr. Torino, whom the two suspect is a pseudonym for Darius Hayes. The clue leads the ladies to a D.C. license plate that belonged to a Ford Torino car they suspect Darius once owned, but they discover it was sold at an auction in 2017 and the paperwork only mentions an anonymous donor. Kyle tells Rojas that he cannot get Alison's phone, but Rojas, aware that Kyle is sleeping with Alison, suggests that Kyle find a way. Rojas reveals that the MayTwos are after the embryos. Kyle decides to tell Alison about the MayTwos' plans, so Alison tells Kyle that she wants to meet with Rojas. Vanessa learns from her private detective that Darius hired a sniper to kill the president, but he has no proof to go along with this claim. With the finalists being publicly announced at a posh hotel, Vanessa recommends to Gabrielle that they move the event elsewhere, but it falls on deaf ears. Gabrielle announces to the public that the finalists will be subjected to polygraph tests that will be televised live. Perry makes it through her test with frankness and honesty. Angela is nervous about her test, revealing to Perry that she lied about being a virgin. She is afraid to reveal this truth to her fiancée and family, causing Angela to damage the polygraph machine by spilling water on it. When Angela makes a decision to quit the lottery, a concerned Perry asks Gabrielle for a favor to help Angela. Perry later returns with sedatives to help Angela calm her nerves so she can pass the test. Angela ends up taking all the sedatives and later dies from an overdose. Perry tells the paramedics about the sedatives, but when she tells Gabrielle about what happened, she tells Perry they cannot let anyone know who gave Angela the sedatives. Darius prepares to put his plans to kill the president into action, getting briefed by the hired sniper who wants to know where he can get a clear shot. Darius becomes suspicious that Rose might have heard his discussions with General Landgon and the Vice President, especially after seeing Rose chatting with Vanessa. When Darius attempts to bond with Rose over dinner, Rose excuses herself to call Vanessa with her suspicions. Darius sees her on the phone and confronts her, prompting her to leave. Rose bumps into a waiter and drops everything, only to leave behind her phone which Darius retrieves. He uses the phone to lure Vanessa by texting her to come to Crystal City. Upon Vanessa's arrival, Darius greets her and insists that she tell him why Rose called her.
9	"Mr. Torino"	Peter Werner	Rick Eid & Timothy J. Sexton	September 21, 2014	0.634
Vanessa, convinced that Darius may have done something to Rose, tells him that she suspects that he plans to kill the President, but Darius tells Vanessa that there is nothing she can do about it. Elsewhere, Rose has been kidnapped and is chained to a bed. Her father later explains that someone was trying to hurt her. Vanessa tells Alison about Darius' plans which could put her in danger, but she tells Vanessa they won't be threatened by Darius. Gabrielle reminds Perry of her promise to give up her baby so that Gabrielle may raise it as her own in exchange for Perry to become very rich. But Perry, still upset over Angela's death, is now apprehensive about the deal. Darius meets with the sniper and General Langdon to discuss plans to incite a riot and kill the president. Alison and Kyle meet with Rojas, who insists on getting the embryos in exchange for helping return Elvis. The three are then joined by a smart and well-financed backer, who says that he wants the embryos to change the world, and plans to bring the mothers-to-be to an island that he just purchased. He even offers Alison a job, but she is skeptical about his intentions. After the meeting, Alison visits Vanessa asking to inspect the embryos. Vanessa is suspicious and asks for a reason, with Alison responding by telling Vanessa, "I want to save the world, just like you." Kyle attempts to steal classified information, which reveals where the DOH will transfer the children. In her final televised interview, Perry, after struggling with telling the truth about Angela's death, mentions how sorry she is to have lost her friend. She says Angela would have made a great mother, and her family should be proud. Meanwhile, Vanessa meets with the President, and notices a picture of a Ford Torino car on his desk, leading her to now suspect the President of being involved with Dr. Kessler. Gabrielle's deal to take Perry's unborn child is exposed by the President, who is furious that Gabrielle is rigging the lottery. He eventually revokes Gabrielle's clearances and warns her not to have any contact with Perry. Darius meets with General Langdon on the eve of the lottery winner announcement, and Langdon reiterates that they need to do something about Rose. After Darius agrees and the two embrace, Darius stabs and kills Langdon.
10	"In Extremis"	Bill Johnson	Rick Eid & Timothy J. Sexton	September 28, 2014	0.425
Vanessa reveals to Gabrielle that her husband, the President, was responsible for causing the fertility crisis. At the same time, Darius and Vice President Melrose put their plans to kill the President in motion. James awakes in the hospital, and directs Alison to remove a data stick from his pants in the closet. The data reveals a list of Dr. Kessler's vaccination subjects. Alison recognizes a person on the list as one who donated to the embryos. She looks up the woman, Alexa, only to find that she is now a post-op transgender man named Alex, but he says he donated eggs to a fertility clinic while still a woman. Fearing what her husband will do once the women are chosen, Gabrielle tells Perry that she will not take her baby and suggests she quit the lottery, but Perry sees this as a stab in the back and refuses. Rojas and Kyle prepare for their planned assault of a DOH convoy that is transporting Elvis. But Rojas has badly underestimated the firepower within the convoy, and he is killed in the melee. A guard has a chance to also kill Kyle as Kyle and Elvis reunite, but the guard draws down his gun and lets them go after seeing Kyle embrace his son. The President finally announces the winners of the lottery, with Perry being hailed as the top vote-earner. The mystery behind the infertility crisis comes to a head, with the President admitting his involvement to Gabrielle. He reveals that he accidentally caused the infertility crisis. He blames himself for authorizing an experimental project to sterilize people, due to the threats of global overpopulation, stating that the project was supposed to be selective, but only to become fatal after the plane crash released the virus. He says his life is now committed to fixing the mistake. After he makes that statement, Gabrielle draws him toward a window for an embrace, and he is shot to death. It turns out that Gabrielle, along with the VP and Darius, were in on the plot to assassinate the President when Gabrielle discovered that her husband caused the infertility crisis. Gabrielle insists that Darius make good on his promise to give her one embryo, and he confirms that he will. Soon after VP Melrose is sworn in to succeed Westwood, he signs an order to have the 100 lottery winners and their future children become government property. The turn of events prompts Alison to flee Washington for her own safety, but Vanessa decides to stay and take on her enemies head on. Alison meets with Kyle to say she was able to successfully fertilize another egg (Alexa's) with his sperm. Alison, Kyle and Elvis prepare to go into hiding, with Allison holding a mini-cryogenic device that contains the fertilized egg.

== See also ==
- The Children of Men, a 1992 book with a similar premise.
- Children of Men, a 2006 film starring Clive Owen, based on the 1992 book.
