= Earthquakes in London =

2010 play by Mike Bartlett

- Written by: Mike Bartlett
- Original language: English

Premiere
- Date premiered: 4 August 2010
- Place premiered: Cottesloe Theatre, London, United Kingdom

Earthquakes in London is a play by Mike Bartlett. It received its world premiere at the Royal National's Cottesloe Theatre on 4 August 2010, following previews from 29 July 2010. The production was directed by Rupert Goold in a co-production with Headlong. The play was also published in 2010.

== Plot ==
The play centres on the lives and loves of three sisters, abandoned long ago by their doom-mongering father. The father is a prominent climate scientist played by Bill Paterson who predicts environmental apocalypse. The eldest sister (Lia Williams) is a cabinet minister who plans to halt all airport expansion, choosing environment over economy. The middle sister (Anna Madeley) is heavily pregnant and growing increasingly depressed about the uncertain future her child is being born into. The youngest sister is a rebellious teenager and frequent nuisance to her career-minded eldest sister. As the three women attempt, in their own different ways, to come to terms with the fact that their father's pessimistic forecasts may be right, Freya, the middle sister, contemplates suicide to avoid bringing her child into an apocalyptic future and an opportunity presents itself for reconciliation with their estranged misanthropic father.

== Original cast ==
The original cast includes Lucy May Barker, Gary Carr, Clive Hayward, Brian Ferguson, Polly Frame, Tom Goodman-Hill, Michael Gould, Anna Madeley, Bill Paterson, Jessica Raine, Geoffrey Streatfeild and Lia Williams.

Jessica Raine and Tom Goodman-Hill met while performing the play and later married.

== Reception ==
The National Theatre/Headlong production received generally positive reviews, with The Guardian, The Independent, The Telegraph and Time Out all awarding the production four stars.

Rupert Goold was "longlisted" for the 2010 Evening Standard Theatre Awards for his direction of the original production. Miriam Buether received the set design award, and she was also shortlisted for the 2011 Laurence Olivier Awards.

== Trivia ==
In 2013, one of Toi Whakaari: NZ Drama School's performances of Earthquakes in London was cancelled due to earthquake activity in New Zealand. Hours before the show opening (16 August) there were two 6 magnitude earthquakes, along with several 4 and 5 magnitude earthquakes. It was decided to cancel that evening's performance.

In May 2015, one of Yateley School's AS Drama groups performed the play. The next day, an earthquake was reported in Kent.

In October 2019, the Trafalgar Theatre Group performed the play in Gibraltar. The next day a 4.5 magnitude earthquake was reported in Andalusia 30 miles away.
