= Spur of the Moment (play) =

Play written by Anya Reiss

- Original language: English
- Written by: Anya Reiss
- Characters: 2 male, 6 female
- Genre: Drama/Comedy

Premiere
- Date: 2010; Royal Court Theatre in London
- Place: Britain

Spur of the Moment is the debut play from Anya Reiss, who wrote it at age 17. It premiered at the Royal Court Theatre London in 2010, directed by Jeremy Herrin.

== Plot ==
In a suburban home in Surrey, Delilah Evans is about to turn 13 and spends the evening singing along to High School Musical with her friends and fantasizing about the charming 21-year-old lodger, Daniel. Her parents, Nick and Vicky, are viciously arguing over Nick's affair with his older boss and consequential sacking. During a family argument on the Friday evening, Delilah kisses Daniel, without her parents' knowledge. The next day, Daniel's girlfriend Leonie has come to stay but their relationship is soon shown to be strained and is repeatedly interrupted by Delilah's friends. Delilah secretly declares her love to an appalled Daniel but when Leonie leaves the house for a while, he succumbs to temptation and passionately kisses Delilah repeatedly. Horrified by his own actions, he declares that he is a 'pathetic loser' and lists the crimes of his past including self-harm. The situation deteriorates on Delilah's birthday as Daniel threatens to leave, while Delilah counters with a threat to tell her parents everything. Vicky breaks down to her daughter about the state of her marriage. Nick overhears their conversation, and he and Vicky call a temporary truce, admitting that they still love each other. Daniel is under pressure and leaves but only after Leonie has witnessed an argument between Daniel and Delilah. She demands to know what is going on from the Evans family. Delilah says she was going to lie and say that Daniel had done something to her if he decided to leave, which he was intending to do anyway, saving Daniel but appalling her family.

== Characters ==
| Character | Original Cast, 2010 |
|---|---|
| Director | Jeremy Herrin |
| Delilah Evans | Shannon Tarbet |
| Nick Evans | Kevin Doyle |
| Vicky Evans | Sharon Small |
| Daniel Mast | James McArdle |
| Leonie Fowler | Aisling Loftus |
| Naomi | Rosie Day |
| Emma M | Jordan Loughran |
| Emma G | Yasmin Paige |

== Premier ==
The play had a 20-minute reading at the Royal Court in 2009 with Jeremy Herrin directing as part of a celebration of the Night Less Ordinary under 26 ticket scheme's success. The reading featured Russell Tovey, Gina McKee, Simon Paisley Day and Flora Spencer-Longhurst.

The play then received its premier at the upstairs Royal Court Theatre in London in 2010. It was directed again by Jeremy Herrin, starring Shannon Tarbet, Sharon Small, Kevin Doyle, James McArdle, Aisling Loftus, Rosie Day, Jordan Loughran and Yasmin Paige. The play then transferred for a five-show run as part of the Royal Court's Theatre Local project at Elephant and Castle Shopping Centre at the end of August 2010.

An extended sell–out at the Royal Court Theatre in London received generally favourable reviews, including 5 stars in the Evening Standard and commentary by Dominic Cavendish of the Daily Telegraph:

"My jaw drops. This is the most accomplished debut from a young playwright I’ve ever had the pleasure to see ... a fresh, funny and blistering indictment of the way we live, parent and grow to maturity now. Whether you’re 17 or 70, go marvel."

It won the 2010 TMA Awards best new play award, and Reiss won both the Critics' Circle Theatre Award and the Evening Standard Award for Most Promising Playwright. James McArdle and Shannon Tarbet were nominated for Outstanding Newcomer and Jeremy Herrin for Best Director at the Evening Standard Awards in 2010.
