= Miriam Buether =

German stage designer

Miriam Buether is a German stage designer who primarily works in London theatre. She was born in Germany and studied stage design at Central Saint Martin's College of Art and Design in London and costume design at the Akademie für Kostüm Design in Hamburg. Her design work includes the West End musical Sunny Afternoon.

== Career ==
Buether received her training in costume design at the Akademie für Kostüm Design in Hamburg, Germany, along with theatre design at Central Saint Martin's in London.

== Stage credits ==
| Year | Title | Role | Venue | Ref. |
|---|---|---|---|---|
| 2004 | Guantanamo: Honor Bound to Defend Freedom | Scenic Designer, Costume Designer | Off-Broadway, 45 Bleecker Street Theater | |
| 2005 | The Wonderful World of Dissocia | Designer | Scotland, Edinburgh International Festival | |
| 2010 | Sucker Punch | Designer | West End, Royal Court Theatre | |
| 2010 | Earthquakes in London | Designer | West End, National Theatre | |
| 2011 | King Lear | Scenic Designer | Off-Broadway, The Public Theater | |
| 2012 | Chariots of Fire | Scenic Designer | West End, Gielgud Theatre | |
| 2012 | The Effect | Designer | West End, National Theatre | |
| 2012 | Wild Swans | Designer | West End, Young Vic | |
| 2014 | Love and Information | Scenic Designer | Off-Broadway, Minetta Lane Theatre | |
| 2015 | The Father | Scenic Designer | West End, Wyndham's Theatre | |
| 2017 | Escaped Alone | Scenic Designer | West End, Royal Court Theatre | |
| 2017 | Escaped Alone | Scenic Designer | Off-Broadway, Brooklyn Academy of Music | |
| 2017 | A Doll's House, Part 2 | Scenic Designer | Broadway, John Golden Theatre | |
| 2017 | The Children | Scenic Designer, Costume Designer | Broadway, Samuel J. Friedman Theatre | |
| 2018 | Three Tall Women | Scenic Designer | Broadway, John Golden Theatre | |
| 2018 | The Jungle | Scenic Designer | West End, Playhouse Theatre | |
| 2018 | The Jungle | Scenic Designer | Off-Broadway, St. Ann's Warehouse | |
| 2019 | King Lear | Scenic Designer, Costume Designer | Broadway, Cort Theatre | |
| 2020 | Who's Afraid of Virginia Woolf? | Scenic Designer | Broadway, Booth Theatre | |
| 2020 | To Kill a Mockingbird | Scenic Designer | West End, Gielgud Theatre | |
| 2021 | To Kill a Mockingbird | Scenic Designer | Broadway, Shubert Theatre | |
| 2023 | Patriots | Scenic Designer | West End, Noël Coward Theatre | |
| 2023 | Prima Facie | Scenic Designer, Costume Designer | Broadway, John Golden Theatre | |
| 2024 | Patriots | Scenic Designer, Costume Designer | Broadway, Ethel Barrymore Theatre | |
| 2025 | Kyoto | Scenic Designer | West End, Soho Place | |
| 2025 | Unicorn | Scenic Designer | West End, Garrick Theatre | |
| 2025 | Stranger Things: The First Shadow | Scenic Designer | Broadway, Marquis Theatre | |
| 2025 | The Hunger Games: On Stage | Scenic Designer | West End, Troubadour Canary Wharf Theatre | |
| 2026 | To Kill a Mockingbird | Scenic Designer | West End, Wyndham's Theatre | |
| 2026 | Who's Afraid of Virginia Woolf? | Scenic Designer | West End, Soho Place | |
| 2026 | Inter Alia | Scenic Designer, Costume Designer | Broadway, Music Box Theatre | |

== Awards and nominations ==
| Year | Award | Category | Work | Result | Ref. |
|---|---|---|---|---|---|
| 1999 | Linbury Prize | Stage Design | Rambert Dance Company | Won | |
| 2005 | Critics' Award for Theatre in Scotland | Best Designer | The Wonderful World of Dissocia | Won | |
| 2008 | Hospital Club Creative Award for Theatre | | | Won | |
| 2010 | Evening Standard Theatre Awards | Best Design | Sucker Punch and Earthquakes in London | Won | |
| 2012 | Critics' Award for Theatre in Scotland | Best Designer | Wild Swans | Won | |
| 2013 | Lucille Lortel Award | Outstanding Scenic Design | Cock | Nominated | |
| 2014 | Lucille Lortel Award | Outstanding Scenic Design | Love and Information | Nominated | |
| 2018 | Evening Standard Theatre Awards | Best Design | The Jungle | Won | |
| 2018 | Drama Desk Award | Outstanding Scenic Design of a Play | Three Tall Women | Won | |
| 2018 | Tony Award | Best Scenic Design of a Play | Three Tall Women | Nominated | |
| 2019 | Drama Desk Award | Outstanding Scenic Design of a Play | The Jungle | Nominated | |
| 2019 | Tony Award | Best Scenic Design of a Play | To Kill a Mockingbird | Nominated | |
| 2023 | Tony Award | Best Scenic Design of a Play | Prima Facie | Nominated | |
| 2024 | Laurence Olivier Award | Best Set Design | Stranger Things: The First Shadow | Won | |
| 2025 | Tony Award | Scenic Design of a Play | Stranger Things: The First Shadow | Won | |
| 2025 | Drama Desk Award | Outstanding Scenic Design of a Play | Stranger Things: The First Shadow | Won | |
| 2025 | Drama Desk Award | Outstanding Scenic Design of a Play | Glass. Kill. What If If Only. Imp. | Nominated | |
| 2026 | Lucille Lortel Award | Outstanding Scenic Design | Glass. Kill. What If If Only. Imp. | Pending | |
