= Rellik (TV series) =

- Genre: Crime drama
- Created by: Harry Williams; Jack Williams
- Starring: Richard Dormer; Jodi Balfour; Paterson Joseph; Lærke Winther; Shannon Tarbet; Paul Rhys; Michael Shaeffer; Rosalind Eleazar; Georgina Rich; Ray Stevenson
- Composer: Clark
- Countries of origin: United Kingdom; United States
- Original language: English
- No. of series: 1
- No. of episodes: 6

Production
- Executive producers: Willow Grylls; Charlie Pattinson; Elaine Pyke; Harry Williams; Jack Williams; Christopher Aird
- Running time: 60 minutes
- Production companies: Two Brothers Pictures; New Pictures

Original release
- Network: BBC One (UK); Cinemax (US)
- Release: 11 September – 16 October 2017

Rellik ("Killer" spelled backwards) is a crime drama television series created and written by brothers Harry and Jack Williams that premiered on 11 September 2017. The project was commissioned by the BBC in 2015, with Cinemax joining them later in November 2016. In the United States the series premiered on 13 April 2018.

== Synopsis ==
The series tells the story of the hunt for a serial killer who always attacks his victims with acid. The chief investigating officer, Detective Chief Inspector Gabriel Markham, himself becomes a victim of the perpetrator but survives the attack. The story is shown in reverse, starting with the police shooting the suspected killer and then moving backwards in sections to finish at the beginning of the story. The period of time the story has moved backwards is shown each time on the screen.

== Cast and characters ==
=== Main ===
- Richard Dormer as DCI Gabriel Markham
- Jodi Balfour as DI Elaine Shepard
- Paterson Joseph as Dr Isaac Taylor
- Lærke Winther as Lisa Markham
- Shannon Tarbet as Hannah Markham
- Paul Rhys as Patrick Barker
- Michael Shaeffer as Steven Mills
- Rosalind Eleazar as Christine Levison
- Georgina Rich as Beth Mills
- Ray Stevenson as DSI Edward Benton

=== Recurring ===
- Clare Holman as Rebecca Barker
- Clive Russell as Henry Parides
- Kieran Bew as DI Mike Sutherland
- Reece Ritchie as DC Asim Fry
- Faye Castelow as DS Jenny Roberts
- Joseph Macnab as DC Sam Myers
- Mimi Ndiweni as DC Andrea Reed
- Michael Wildman as DI Martin Brook
- Tanya Reynolds as Sally
- Annabel Bates as Jill Parides
- Charlotte Dylan as Cassie Hughes
- Richard Cunningham as Brian Sweeney
- Lucy Chappell as Kerri
- Michael Sardine as Dr Jonas Borner

== Episodes ==
No.	Title	Directed by	Written by	UK release date	US release date	UK viewers (millions)	US viewers (millions)
1	"Episode 1"	Sam Miller	Harry Williams, Jack Williams	11 September 2017	13 April 2018	4.96	0.058
2	"Episode 2"	Sam Miller	Harry Williams, Jack Williams	18 September 2017	20 April 2018	2.82	0.088
3	"Episode 3"	Sam Miller	Harry Williams, Jack Williams	25 September 2017	27 April 2018	N/A	0.052
4	"Episode 4"	Hans Herbots	Marston Bloom	2 October 2017	4 May 2018	N/A	0.055
5	"Episode 5"	Hans Herbots	Harry Williams, Jack Williams	9 October 2017	11 May 2018	N/A	0.062
6	"Episode 6"	Sam Miller	Max Barnes	16 October 2017	18 May 2018	N/A	0.064

== Production ==
Harry Williams and Jack Williams began writing Rellik while they were filming and editing the first series of The Missing. "We didn't want it to be a technical exercise," the pair remarked, "so we had to ask ourselves why you'd tell a story that way. It became clear quite quickly that it was all about motive. That things happen for a reason and those reasons lie in the past. So, what happens when you start at the end and find your way back to the past sounded like an interesting thing to explore."

== Reception ==
Initial reaction after the first episode were mixed: some people struggled to understand the programme's style. Episode one's consolidated viewing figure of 4.96 million fell to 2.82 million for episode two and subsequent episodes failed to register at all in the top 30 programmes for the week on BBC1. However, after the show's finale, it received acclaim from critics.
