= Anya Reiss =

British playwright and screenwriter (born 1991)

- Born: 27 November 1991 (age 34); Camberwell, London, England
- Occupations: Playwright, screenwriter

Anya Reiss (born 27 November 1991) is a British playwright and screenwriter.

== Career ==
The youngest writer to have a play staged in London, a graduate of the Royal Court's Young Writers Programme, when she was 17 years old, she had her first play Spur of the Moment staged there in the Upstairs Jerwood Theatre in July 2010, directed by Jeremy Herrin. The play went on to win the 2010 TMA Award for Best New Play; the Evening Standard and the Critics' Circle Award for Most Promising Playwright.

Her second play The Acid Test was staged in 2011, again at the Royal Court Theatre; it was directed by Simon Godwin.

In 2012, she adapted Chekhov's The Seagull for Southwark Playhouse which was then revived in 2022 with Jamie Lloyd and starring Emilia Clarke. She also wrote a play for the National Theatre's Connections season called Forty Five Minutes.

Reiss has also written for theatre and television. As of December 2018, she has written 27 episodes of long-running BBC drama EastEnders, including a special episode about sexual consent in 2018. She also wrote several episodes of school drama Ackley Bridge, which debuted in 2017.

In 2022, her historical drama Becoming Elizabeth premiered on Starz. The series follows the younger years of Queen Elizabeth I.

== Personal life ==
Reiss' parents, Bob and Dixie Reiss, married in 1985. Her father served as chaplain of Trinity College, Cambridge, Archdeacon of Surrey and canon treasurer of Westminster Abbey.

== Work ==
- Oliver Twist (2017) Regent's Park Theatre, adapted from the novel by Charles Dickens, directed by Caroline Byrne
- Uncle Vanya (2014) St. James Theatre, adapted from Anton Chekhov, directed by Russell Bolam
- Spring Awakening (2014) Headlong / West Yorkshire Playhouse / Nuffield, adapted from Frank Wedekind
- Three Sisters (2014) Southwark Playhouse, adapted from Chekhov
- Forty Five Minutes (2013) The Shed at National Theatre
- The Seagull (2012) Southwark Playhouse, adapted from Chekhov
- The Acid Test (2011) Royal Court Theatre, upstairs theatre, directed by Simon Godwin
- Spur of the Moment (2010) Royal Court Theatre, upstairs theatre, directed by Jeremy Herrin
