= The Juilliard Experiment =

The Juilliard Experiment: An Adventure with Music and Musicians
- Directed by: Mark Kidel
- Produced by: Mark Kidel
- Starring: Fabienne Verdier
- Edited by: Andrew Findlay
- Music by: Sam Kidel
- Distributed by: ZED
- Release date: October 1, 2016 (United States)
- Running time: 83 minutes
- Country: United Kingdom
- Language: English

The Juilliard Experiment: An Adventure with Music and Musicians is a 2016 British documentary film directed and produced by Mark Kidel. It follows French abstract painter Fabienne Verdier's experience during her semester at the Juilliard School as its first artist-in-residence in 2014. Verdier is shown developing work, reflecting on her process, and developing more paintings back at her studio in Le Vexin, France.

The film was released at the Raindance Film Festival in London on October 1, 2016 and played in other venues in London and at the Aix-en-Provence Festival.

== Synopsis ==
The film follows Verdier, a French painter trained in the Chinese classical painting and calligraphy tradition, at her residency at Juilliard, and her painting to live Juilliard faculty and students playing in her studio or their classes or tutorials. They include composer and pianist Philip Lasser improvising, cellist Darrett Adkins playing, the Chair of Voice Edith Wiens working with Verdier, and a jazz band featuring Kenny Barron improvising in Verdier's residency studio. William Christie conduct a group of students and Wiens works with the contralto Avery Amereau in other classrooms with Verdier in attendance.

Archival photos shows Verdier's grandfather who was a composer. In the film, she expressed an artistic debt to him, saying "He definitely gave me this taste for invention, for exploration and the enjoyment of connection with music." There are also archival photos of Verdier and her training with Master Huang in Chongqing, China.

With her husband under her paper and glass, Verdier interprets the live music in her studio or a classroom drawing from a variety of pens or homemade brushes. In the residency studio, after each composition, the musicians marvel at the finish work and talk about elements in the music that they had just played that they see in it. The film follows Verdier back to her Chambly studio, on the edge of the Vexin region. She prepares her “Walking Paintings” series to Philip Lasser, who came over from New York especially.

The Juilliard Experiment touches on the themes of painting's parallel relationship to music, music's influence on and the importance of the breath in the creative act. T magazine's Hettie Judah wrote "In working alongside musicians, Verdier hoped to shake herself of mental habits built up over 30 years of work." Kidel on the film's website describes the film's narrative as Verdier "gradually freeing herself."

=== Musicians who appear in the film ===
- Composer Philip Lasser on the piano improvising
- William Christie conducting students of Juilliard 415 in a Handel composition
- Cellist Darrett Adkins playing an Elliott Carter piece
- Contralto opera student Avery Amereau working with Chair of Voice Edith Wiens
- Wiens working with Verdier to a recording of herself singing Mozart concert aria with the Symphonie orchester des Bayerischen Rundfunks
- Jazz band improvising: With Kenny Barron on piano, Lukas Gabric (tenor saxophone), Paolo Bebedettini (bass), Jordan Young (drums), and Greg Duncan (guitar)

== Production and filming ==
Kidel had made a 60-minute film Fabienne Verdier: Painting the Moment in 2013 for French television, then several short films for her for the artist's website. Her husband informed Kidel of the Juilliard residency for which they were about to embark to New York for, and Kidel sensed "something speciai, something new" and decided to document it. The couple were already planning on documenting her activity from underneath the painting, inspired by the 1956 Henri-Georges Clouzot documentary, Le mystère Picasso, in which the painter was shot painting on glass with the camera on the other side. Shortly after starting in New York, Kidel felt there was enough material for a full-length documentary, "the interactions were producing really interesting work, and it was a marvelous atmosphere in the studio and real stuff going on."

Kidel describes in writing about the film in The Arts Desk that it is "mostly observational in style, and sometimes slow" the latter "trying to evoke something of the nature of reflection and communication." He also writes that he doesn't "believe that there is an obvious or literal connection between music and painting. This would be no more than illustration, which isn't what Fabienne is seeking to achieve. She senses instead a kind of interpersonal resonance in the act of creation – she calls it a concomitance – as if the people making the work, music or painting, were breathing the same air, sharing a creative space and moving to the same rhythm."

== Release and reception ==
The film was released at the Raindance Film Festival in London in 2016 and screened the following year at the Ciné Lumière at the Institut français du Royaume-Uni in London, at a Second Home location in the same city to follow Verdier’s first UK solo show "Rhythms and Reflections" (until 4 February 2017) at Waddington Custot in London, where the "Walking Paintings" were exhibited. The Juilliard Experiment also played at the Aix-en-Provence Music Festival.

The release was accompanied by a 43-page book published by Friedrich Holderin, and The Arts Desk published Kidel's writing on it. T magazine's Hettie Judah touched upon the work in an article a month later about the artist, saying "Perhaps the most affecting scene comes as she works with the soprano Edith Wiens, who coaches her breath-work as she would a vocal student’s, holding Verdier around the waist as she draws an aria that builds up like a towering mass of sound lines."

== Postscript ==
The finished works from The Juilliard Experiment were exhibited at Patrick Derom Gallery in Brussels from December 1, 2016 to February 11, 2017 and accompanied by a 113-page catalogue. The experience led to further work with musicians, notably a number of string quartets in Aix-en-Provence, with live painting projected on large screens before an audience.

Verdier has also since worked with a lexicographer, in preparing paintings that evoke the duality of a number of words and which were used in the 50th anniversary to the Robert dictionary. The themes depicted in the film continue to be featured in her work: Verdier's reaction of painting an ascendant vortex to aria singing was central to her solo exhibition at Waddington Custot in October 2020.
