= Fabienne Verdier =

French painter (born 1962)

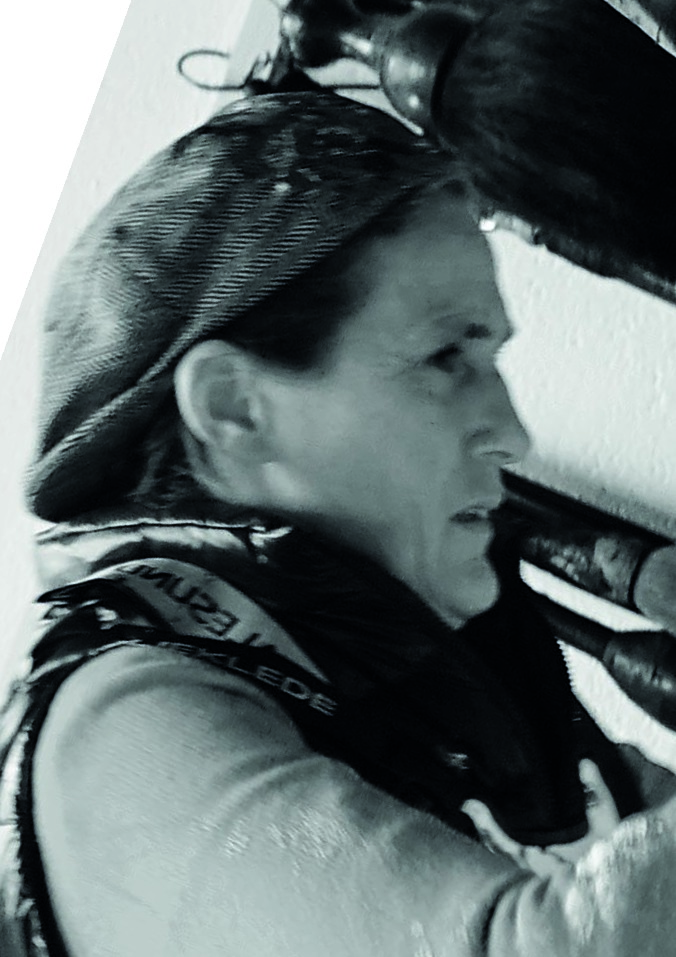
Fabienne Verdier, in 2017.

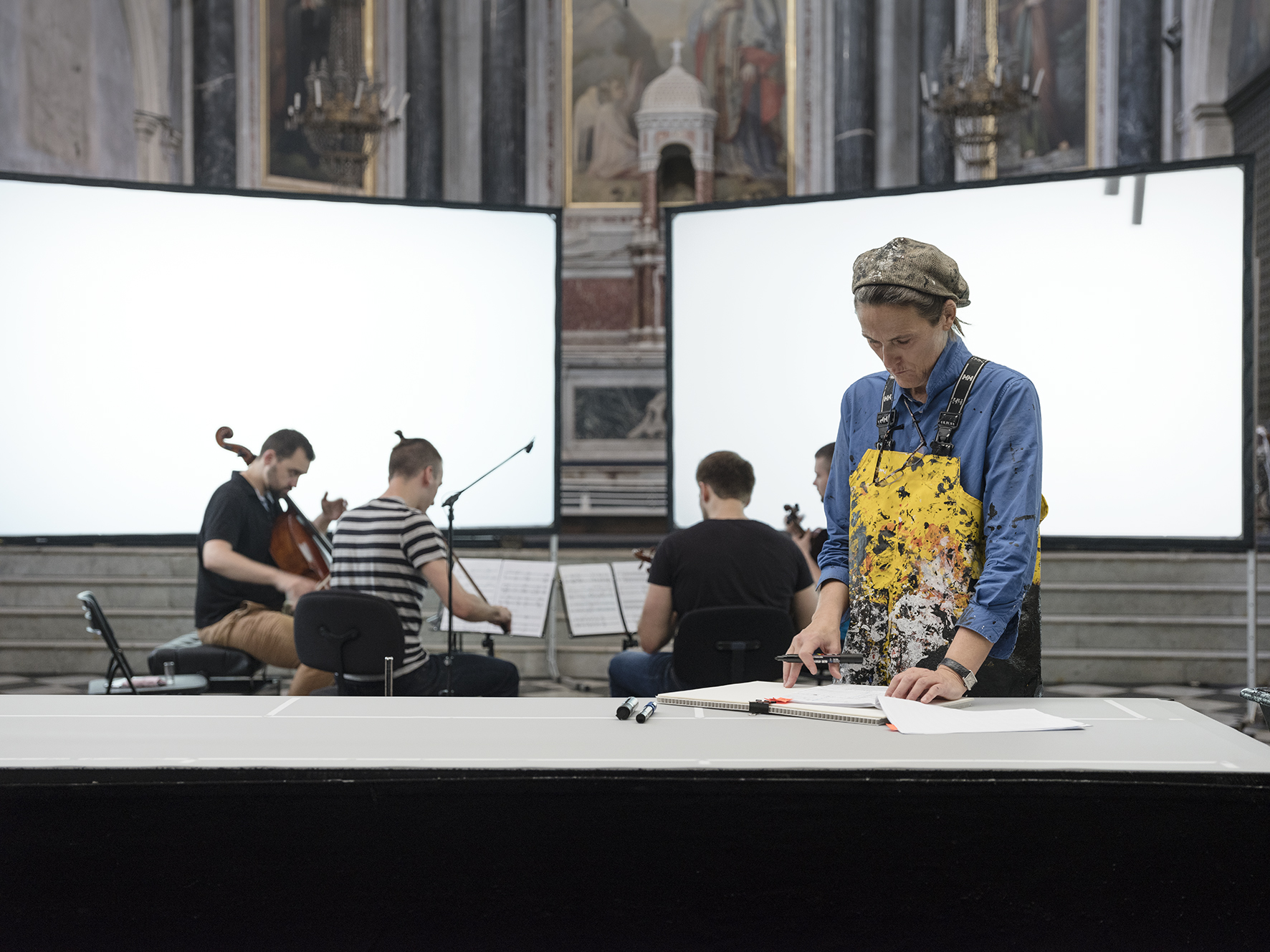

Fabienne Verdier (born 1962) is a French painter who works in France after years of studies in China. She was the first non-Chinese woman to be awarded a post-graduate diploma in fine arts by the Sichuan Fine Arts Institute in Chongqing, China.

== Early life ==
Fabienne Verdier was born in 1962, Paris, France.

In 1985, at 22, Verdier left for China to study at the Sichuan Fine Arts Institute in Chongqing. She chose at the same time to work alongside and train with the last great Chinese painters who had survived the Cultural Revolution, whom she persuaded to transmit their mastery of spontaneous painting and aesthetic theories despite continued bans. After becoming the first foreign woman to be awarded a post-graduate diploma in fine arts by the institute, Verdier began to progressively create her own new abstract painting.

== Career ==
Verdier's artistic path has taken her through successive phases of research, all focused on her fundamental areas of interest, including the dynamism of forces of nature, the instantaneous and enduring, and incessant movement. By adopting new tools and ever-larger brushstrokes, she proposes to enable viewers to better access the infinite world of energy and transformations she extensively explores.

For the 50th anniversary edition of Le Petit Robert, France's household dictionary invited Verdier to celebrate the creative forces of the French language. Having been given a carte blanche, Verdier collaborated with lexicographer Alain Rey to create 22 works organized around word pairs such as arborescence-allegory, force-form, rhythm-reflection and duality-dialogue that appear in fold out pages throughout the text. Many of the paintings were exhibited at the Musée Voltaire in Geneva in late 2017 in a show organized by the Bibliothèque de Genève, coordinated by Alexandre Vanautgaerden. The art book Polyphonies, a co-publication of Albin Michel and Editions Robert, goes behind the scenes of the project to explore its three-year genesis and highlights the extensive artistic research behind the work in the form of preparatory collages.

Current lines of research into the dynamics of forms has led Verdier to explore possible links between music and painting, specifically between pictorial and sonic lines. In July, 2017, at the invitation of the Festival d'Aix-en-Provence and its Académie, Verdier set up an experimental studio/laboratory in painting and music, with the goal of creating a new 360° immersive film experience for public viewing at the 2018 edition of the Festival. As an artist in residence at the Juilliard School in New York City for several months in 2014, she worked with some of its foremost faculty members, including Darrett Adkins, Kenny Barron, William Christie, Philip Lasser and Edith Wiens, as well as with many students. A documentary by filmmaker Mark Kidel, The Juilliard Experiment, relating the extensive experiments carried out in Verdier's studio-laboratory at the famous American music and acting conservatory, was released in 2016.

In 2014, the Pinakothek der Moderne of Munich invited Verdier to create an installation of seven works on the theme of transformation. Entitled Mélodie du réel, it was presented at the Herrenchiemsee Palace, together with key works by German and American artists from the museum's permanent collection. Also that year, the city of Hong Kong organized the first retrospective of Verdier's work: over thirty-five paintings and drawings, loaned mainly by public and private collections and covering the last thirty years of her career, were exhibited at Hong Kong City Hall with the support of the French Ministry of Foreign Affairs. Finally, 2014 saw the completion of a 13-meter-high monumental painting inside the entrance to the new Tour Majunga at La Défense in Puteaux, near Paris. The work was commissioned by Unibail-Rodamco, under the aegis of architect Jean-Paul Viguier.

In 2013, in the conceptual phase of the new National Art Museum of China (NAMOC) in Beijing, architect Jean Nouvel asked Verdier to assist him, soliciting her thoughts and drawing on her knowledge of dynamism to shape a building that would transpose the simplicity, energy and power of a single brushstroke.

In 2012, Verdier discovered a way to "dematerialize" her brush, leading her to develop a new technique that she called "Walking-Paintings". These new works were first presented in Singapore at Art Plural Gallery. The following year, Galerie Jaeger Bucher in Paris held a solo exhibition featuring this new series.

In 2009, Verdier embarked on an intense period of research and painting. Long fascinated by the strength of the color spectrum but also the mystery of intriguing immobility in works by the 15th century Flemish primitives, she created a large body of sketches and paintings, drawing particular inspiration from six important works: Virgin and Child with Canon van der Paele (1436) and Portrait of Margaret van Eyck (1439) by Jan van Eyck; Death of the Virgin (c. 1481) by Hugo van der Goes; the Moreel Triptych by Hans Memling (1484); and the Simon Marmion diptych Mater Dolorosa and Man of Sorrows (c. 1460).

The Groeninge and Memling museums in Bruges would ultimately exhibit the results of Verdier's research side by side with their inspirations in the museum galleries. Daniel Abadie acted as visiting curator and edited a compendium entitled Fabienne Verdier, L'Esprit de la Peinture. A concurrent show of Verdier's preparatory drawings and notebooks was held at the Erasmus House museum in Brussels. Fabienne Verdier et les Maîtres Flamands, notes et carnets by Alexandre Vanautgaerden was published by Éditions Albin Michel.

As she was expanding her research into spontaneity, Verdier also turned her interest to early Italian frescos and specifically to Quattrocento masters. During this period, the Torlonia family in Rome commissioned her to create a contemporary fresco of monumental paintings (5m x 8m) for a reception room in the family palazzo. Her research related to the project was recorded in studio notebooks and reproduced in Fabienne Verdier, Palazzo Torlonia (2010), by Eric Fouache and Corinna Thierolf.

In 2007, the Musée National d'Art Moderne (Centre Pompidou) in Paris acquired its first Verdier painting. In 2005, drawn by the energy and dynamism of the works shown at Verdier's first solo exhibition in Switzerland at the Alice Pauli Gallery in Lausanne, the Hubert Looser Foundation of Zurich commissioned her to create a series of paintings to resonate with Abstract Expressionist and Minimalist works in its permanent collection by American artists including John Chamberlain, Donald Judd, Willem de Kooning, Ellsworth Kelly and Cy Twombly.

Several other museums have since included Verdier's Looser Foundation paintings in exhibitions, including "Art of Deceleration, from Caspar David Friedrich to Ai Wei Wei," Kunstmuseum Wolfsburg, Germany, 2011; "My Private Passion – Foundation Hubert Looser," Vienna Kunstforum, 2012; "The Hubert Looser Collection," Kunsthaus Zürich, 2013; and "Formes simples," Centre Pompidou-Metz, France, 2014.

In 2002, following her return to France after nearly a decade of intense work and immersion in China, Verdier wrote about this apprenticeship inside a radically different system of thought. Her account, Passagère du Silence, published by Albin Michel in 2003, won several prizes, was translated into six languages and sold over 230,000 copies.

== Creative process ==
Verdier's creative process most often involves three phases. First, she records her research, thoughts and observations in notebooks, sketches and inks on paper. Then she prepares the canvas by applying several layers of pigment and glaze in order to obtain the desired degree of vibration, saturation and depth of color. Finally, standing directly on the stretcher and using tools of her own invention, she shapes the paint matter to express fundamental life forces.

== Selected exhibitions ==
=== Solo ===
- 2024 Retables, Galerie Lelong & Co., Paris, France
- 2024 Horizons et Chênes-lièges, Galerie Lelong & Co., Paris, France
- 2023 La mouvance de la matière, Château Lynch-Bages, Pauillac, France
- 2022 Im Auge des Kosmos, Saarlandmuseum – Moderne Galerie, Saarbruck, Allemagne
- 2022 Alchimie d’un vitrail, Musée Camille Claudel, Nogent-sur-Seine, France
- 2022 Le chant des étoiles, Musée Unterlinden, Colmar, France
- 2021 Arias - Nouvelles estampes, Galerie Lelong & Co., Paris, France
- 2020 Fabienne Verdier, Vortex, Waddington Custot, London, England
- 2019 Sur les terres de Cézanne, Musée Granet, Aix-en-Provence, France
- 2019 Autour d'un timbre, Galerie Lelong & Co., Paris, France
- 2019 Musée du Pavillon de Vendôme, Aix-en-Provence, France
- 2019 Cité du Livre, Galerie Zola, Aix-en-Provence, France
- 2018 Ainsi la nuit, Galerie Lelong & Co., Paris, France
- 2017 Silencieuses coïncidences, Galerie Lelong & Co., Paris, France
- 2017 L'expérience du langage, Musée Voltaire, Geneva, Switzerland
- 2017 Galerie Alice Pauli, Lausanne, Switzerland
- 2016 Patrick Derom Gallery, Brussels, Belgium
- 2016 Fabienne Verdier, Rhythms and Reflections, Waddington Custot, London, United Kingdom
- 2015 Galerie Alice Pauli, Lausanne, Switzerland
- 2014 Retrospective, Le French May, City Hall, Hong Kong, curated by Daniel Abadie
- 2013 Galerie Jaeger Bucher, Paris, France
- 2013 Fabienne Verdier, L’Esprit de la Peinture, Hommage aux Maîtres Flammands, Groeninge Museum and Hans Memling Museum, Bruges, Belgium, curated by Daniel Abadie
- 2013 Art Plural Gallery, Singapore
- 2009 Galerie Jaeger Bucher, Paris, France
- 2007 Galerie Alice Pauli, Lausanne, Switzerland
- 2005 Galerie Alice Pauli, Lausanne, Switzerland

=== Group ===
- 2022 Jeux d'eau au jardin, Domaine de Chaumont-sur-Loire, Chaumont-sur-Loire, France
- 2020 TRANSFORMACIONES - Mujeres artistas entre dos siglos, Fundación CajaCanarias, Santa Cruz de Tenerife, Espagne
- 2019 Un Autre Œil, MASC, Sables d'Olonne, France
- 2019 Picasso - Gorky - Warhol, Kunsthaus Zurich, Switzerland
- 2018 Picasso - Gorky - Warhol, Kunsthalle Krems, Austria
- 2018 Un Autre Œil, Musée d’Art Contemporain de Dunkerque, France
- 2017 Passion de l'Art, Musée Granet, Aix-en-Provence, France
- 2017 Restless Gestures, National Museum of Art, Architecture & Design, Oslo, Norway
- 2017 Fabienne Verdier Meets Sigmar Polke. Talking Lines, Pinakothek der Moderne, Munich, Germany, curated by Bernhard Maaz and Corinna Thierolf
- 2016 Collection Looser – Museum Folkwang, A Dialogue, Museum Folkwang, Essen, Germany, curated by Mario von Lüttichau and Florian Steininger
- 2016 The World Meets Here, Custot Gallery, Dubai, United Arab Emirates
- 2015 Köningsklasse III, organised by Pinakothek der Moderne, Munich, at Herrenschiemsee Palace, Bavaria, Germany, curated by Corinna Thierolf
- 2014 Formes Simples, Centre Pompidou-Metz, France, curated by Jean de Loisy
- 2014 Köningsklasse II, organized by Pinakothek der Moderne of Munich at Herrenschiemsee Palace, Bavaria, Germany, curated by Corinna Thierolf
- 2013 The Hubert Looser Collection, Kunsthaus, Zurich, Switzerland, curated by Philippe Büttner
- 2012 My Private Passion – Foundation Hubert Looser, Kunstforum, Vienna, Austria, curated by Florian Steininger
- 2011 Art of Deceleration, from Caspar David Friedrich to Ai Wei Wei, Kunstmuseum, Wolfsburg, Germany, curated by Markus Brüderlin
- 2009 Elles@Centre Pompidou, Musée National d’Art Moderne, Centre Georges Pompidou, Paris, France, curated by Camille Morineau

== Public collections ==
- Musée National d'Art Moderne, Centre Georges Pompidou, Paris, France
- Musée Cernuschi, Paris, France
- Foundation Hubert Looser, Zurich, Switzerland
- Pinakothek der Moderne, Munich, Germany
- Foundation François Pinault, Paris, France, and Venice, Italy
- Palais Bourbon, Paris, France
- Tour Majunga (developer Unibail-Rodamco), La Défense, Puteaux, France
- Centre national des arts plastiques, La Défense, France (commission by the Festival d’Avignon)
- Ministère de l’Équipement (Direction de l’Architecture), Paris, France
- Ministère des Affaires Étrangères, Paris, France
- Chinese Ministry of Culture, Beijing, China
- Musée Granet, Aix-en-Provence, France
- Juilliard School, New York, USA
- Kunsthaus Zürich, Zurich, Switzerland
- Collection Pinault, Paris, France and Venice, Italia

== Books and films ==
- Fabienne Verdier. Sur le motif by Alain Rey and Fabienne Verdier, Lelong Éditions, 2021
- Fabienne Verdier, sur les terres de Cézanne by Alexandre Vanautgaerden (dir.), 5 Continents Editions, 2019
- Polyphonies by Alain Rey and Fabienne Verdier, Éditions Le Robert and Albin Michel, 2017
- Le Petit Robert de la Langue Française edited by Alain Rey and Josette Rey-Debove, featuring 22 original works by Fabienne Verdier, Éditions Le Robert, 2017
- The Juilliard Experiment, documentary film by Mark Kidel, Calliope Media, 2016
- Crossing Signs by Daniel Abadie, Éditions Albin Michel, 2014
- L’Esprit de la Peinture, Hommage aux Maîtres Flamands by Daniel Abadie, Éditions Albin Michel, 2013
- Les Maîtres Flamands, Notes et Carnets by Alexandre Vanautgaerden, Éditions Albin Michel, 2013
- Fabienne Verdier: Painting Space by Doris von Drathen, Edizioni Charta, Milan 2013
- Fabienne Verdier: Peindre l’Instant, documentary film by Mark Kidel, Films d’Ici, 2012
- Fabienne Verdier: Palazzo Torlonia by Philippe Chancel, Éditions Xavier Barral, 2011
- Fabienne Verdier: Flux, documentary film by Philippe Chancel, 2010
- Entre Ciel et Terre by Fabienne Verdier, Éditions Albin Michel, 2007
- Entretien avec Fabienne Verdier by Charles Juliet, Éditions Albin Michel, 2007
- Passagère du Silence by Fabienne Verdier, Éditions Albin Michel, 2005
- L’Unique Trait de Pinceau by Fabienne Verdier, Éditions Albin Michel, 2001
