= Ashleigh Gray =

Scottish actress and theatre performer

Ashleigh Gray is a Scottish actress and musical theatre performer best known for playing Elphaba in the London and UK & Ireland touring productions of Wicked.

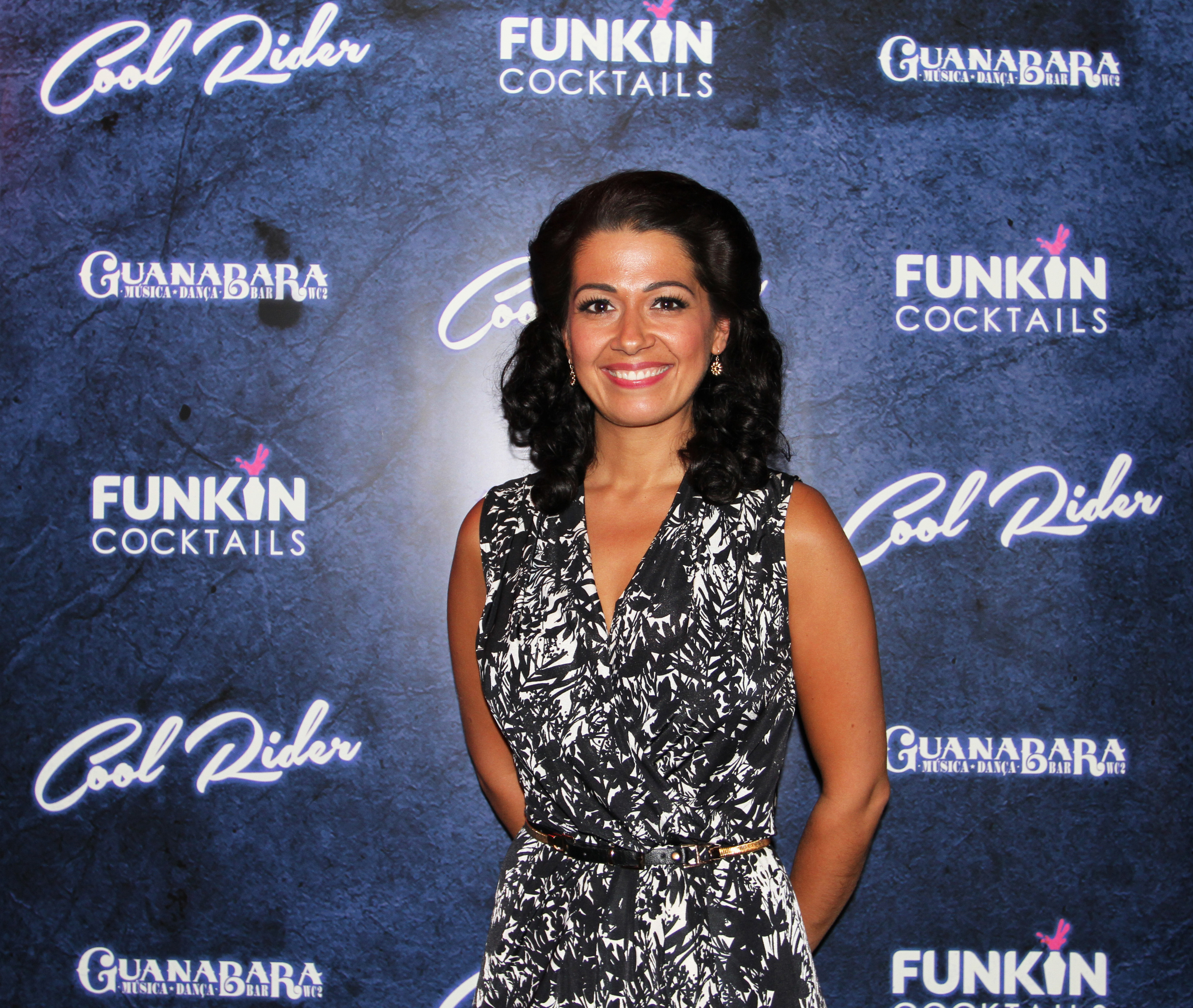
Ashleigh Gray at the Cool Rider Album Launch Party 2015

== Early life ==
Gray was born in Fife, Scotland and educated at Newbattle Community High School in Dalkeith. In 2003, she graduated from the Guildford School of Acting, where she received the Margaret Veale Award for Singing and the principals award for Musical Theatre. In 2001, Gray returned to Newbattle High School to give a talk to pupils, during which she was surprised by a TV crew and BBC TV star Jane McDonald who were filming her for a series called Star for a Night.

== Career ==
In 2004, Gray made her professional début as Kim in the UK national tour of the Boy George musical Taboo. She was also a soloist in the concert Notes from New York. Prior to this she played the role of Kirsty in Only You Can Save Mankind at the Edinburgh Festival. In 2006, she appeared in NHS the Musical at the Drum Theatre Plymouth and covered Rizzo and Jan in the UK national tour of Grease. In 2007, Gray performed the role of Emily in the European première of Myths and Hymns and again that year at the Finborough theatre.

On 16 July 2007, she joined the London company of the musical Wicked at the Apollo Victoria Theatre, where she performed in the ensemble, performing primarily as Glinda's friend at university Pfanee. She also understudied the role of Elphaba. She played her first performance as the not-so-wicked witch 6 February 2008. She then became Elphaba standby from 9 June 2008, replacing Cassidy Janson. After a lengthy run in the show, she departed at cast change on 27 March 2010, with her final appearance as Elphaba on 12 March. She was replaced by Nikki Davis-Jones. Soon enough, Ashleigh made a special one-night return to the role for the evening performance of 28 October 2010, due to the indisposition of all the current Elphaba's at the time. She then became the emergency cover Elphaba, for the 18 February 2011 performance, in which Davis-Jones, Gray's replacement, left mid-first act due to illness, and the current understudy was not rehearsed.

Gray has also been part of the Notes From New York series including shows at the Trafalgar studios. On 9 December 2007 she also appeared in the Christmas version of the show Christmas in New York, at the Lyric Theatre, singing alongside her Wicked co-star Oliver Tompsett, Julie Atherton and Rachael Wooding. Gray's songs included Grown up Christmas List and Have Yourself a Merry Little Christmas with Oliver Tompsett. Along with stage musicals, Gray has worked with Oliver Tompsett on his debut album, Sentimental Heart, for which she recorded a duet with him.

On 26 September 2010 Gray joined composer Scott Alan at his concert " Simply The Music of Scott Alan" in London's West End. The concert also featured Louise Dearman, Patina Miller, Sierra Boggess, Jodie Jacobs, Alex Gaumond and Hadley Fraser. Gray performed the song "Please Don't Let Me Go".

On 25 April 2011, Gray hosted her first solo cabaret "Easter With Ashleigh Gray". In which she performed a host of songs from her career, new songs written for her and some of her personal favourite songs. In the summer of 2011 she took part in a workshop and reading of the musical "Girlfriends" by Laurence Mark Wythe. In the summer of 2011 Gray played Miranda in Betwixt! at Trafalgar Studios, a role for which she received several nominations for Best Actress in a Musical.

Gray originated the role of Lorraine Campbell in 'I Dreamed A Dream' the Susan Boyle Musical which toured the UK and Ireland in 2012.

Later credits include The West End Men alongside Lee Mead, Ramin Karimloo and Stephen Rahman Hughes. Momentous Musicals alongside John Owen-Jones and Gareth Gates.

In 21 October 2013, Gray returned to the West End company of Wicked as the standby for Elphaba. She was replaced by Emma Hatton on 2 December. As of 3 March 2014, Gray returned once again to provide emergency cover as the standby for Elphaba for three weeks.

Gray joined a West End Repertory Cast to present three brand new musicals as part of the 'From Page to Stage' Season at the Landor Theatre from 25 to 27 February 2014. Gray played the role of Wanda in Van Winkle - a folk musical. Gray performed two songs, "Watching The Door" and "I'm Home".

Following its one-off performance at the Lyric Theatre on Monday 27 January 2014, Cool Rider Live returned to the West End for one week at the Duchess Theatre (15–19 April 2014). Gray once again led the cast as Stephanie in this Cult Musical sequel. The show received multiple 4 and 5-star reviews on Press Night.

Gray and John Barrowman recorded a duet "Bridge Over Troubled Water" on his latest album You Raise Me Up which was released towards the end of June 2014.

On 16 September 2014, Gray took over lead as Elphaba in Wicked (UK tour) replacing Nikki Davis-Jones.

After a successful Kickstarter campaign, Cool Rider Live released an Original Cast Recording on 29 June 2015 Gray recorded the title track 'Cool Rider' on 28 April 2015. In January 2016, the Cool Rider LP (Vinyl) was released and is available directly from the Cool Rider Live website

== Musicals ==
Year	Musical	Role	Venue
2004	Taboo, The Boy George Musical	Kim	Various Locations
2006	NHS The Musical	The Administrator	Drum Theatre
2006	Grease, UK Tour	Miss Lynch/1st Cover Rizzo & Jan	Various Locations
2007	Myths and Hymns	Emily	Oyster catcher/Finborough Theatre
2007–2008	Wicked	Pfannee / 1st Cover Elphaba	Apollo Victoria Theatre
2008–2010	Wicked	Standby Elphaba	Apollo Victoria Theatre
2010	Robin Hood	Maid Marion	Castle Theatre Wellingborough
2011	Betwixt!	Miranda	Trafalgar Studio 2
2011	Mother Goose	Wicked Witch	Oxford Playhouse
2012	After The Turn	Amanda	Courtyard Theatre
2012	I Dreamed A Dream	Lorraine Campbell	Theatre Royal
2012–2013	Jack & The Beanstalk (Panto)	Fairy Firefly	Glasgow SECC Clyde Auditorium
2013	The Secret Garden, UK Tour	Martha	Various Locations
2013, 2014	Wicked	Standby Elphaba	Apollo Victoria Theatre
2013–2014	Dick McWhittington (Panto)	Aurora - Spirit of the Northern Lights	Glasgow SECC Clyde Auditorium
2014	Van Winkle (From Page To Stage Showcase)	Wanda	Landor Theatre
2014	Cool Rider Live	Stephanie Zinone	Lyric Theatre and Duchess Theatre
2014–2015	Wicked	Elphaba	UK & Ireland Tour
2015–2016	Dick Whittington (Panto)	Spirit of the Bells	Dartford Orchard Theatre
2016	Muted (Rehearsed Reading)	Amanda	Iris Theatre
2016	Vanities	Kathy	Trafalgar Studios 2
2016–2018	Robin Hood (Panto)	Spirit of Sherwood	Southampton Mayflower Theatre (2016) and New Victoria Theatre, Woking (2017)
2018	Company	Amy	Aberdeen Arts Centre
2018-2019	Nativity! The Musical	Jennifer Lore	Eventim Apollo, London and UK tour
