= The Amazing Maurice =

2022 film by Toby Genkel

- Theatrical release poster
- Directed by: Toby Genkel
- Screenplay by: Terry Rossio
- Based on: The Amazing Maurice and His Educated Rodents by Terry Pratchett
- Produced by: Emely Christians; Andrew Baker; Robert Chandler; Rob Wilkins
- Starring: Hugh Laurie; Emilia Clarke; David Thewlis; Himesh Patel; Gemma Arterton; Joe Sugg; Ariyon Bakare; Julie Atherton; Rob Brydon; Hugh Bonneville; David Tennant
- Edited by: Friedolin Dreesen
- Music by: Tom Howe
- Production companies: Ulysses Filmproduktion; Cantilever Media; Narrativia; Sky; Moonshot Films; Red Star 3D; Studio Rakete; Squeeze Animation Studio
- Distributed by: Sky (United Kingdom); Telepool (Germany)
- Release dates: 13 November 2022 (Manchester Animation Festival); 16 December 2022 (United Kingdom)
- Running time: 93 minutes
- Countries: Germany; United Kingdom; Canada
- Language: English
- Budget: €15 million
- Box office: $21.1 million

The Amazing Maurice is a 2022 animated fantasy comedy film directed by Toby Genkel and co-directed by Florian Westermann, from a screenplay by Terry Rossio, based on the 2001 novel The Amazing Maurice and His Educated Rodents by Terry Pratchett. The film stars Hugh Laurie, Emilia Clarke, David Thewlis, Himesh Patel, Gemma Arterton, Joe Sugg, Ariyon Bakare, Julie Atherton, Rob Brydon, Hugh Bonneville and David Tennant. The story follows Maurice, a streetwise ginger cat who befriends the talking rats by coming up with a money-making scam.

An animated film adaptation of Pratchett's novel was announced in June 2019, with Rossio writing the screenplay. Most of the lead cast members were hired in November 2020, with additional cast being added in May 2021. Animation was provided by Squeeze Animation Studio, Studio Rakete and Red Star 3D.

The Amazing Maurice had its premiere at the Manchester Animation Festival on 13 November 2022, and was released in the United Kingdom on 16 December, by Sky. It was released on 3 February 2023 by Viva Pictures in the United States. The film received generally positive reviews from critics.

== Plot ==
A opening sequence shows Malicia, daughter of a mayor, reads a book called “The Adventures of Mr. Bunnsy Has a Adventure” and it tells the story of Mr. Bunnsy, a rabbit who hops into a garden which is beside a house, his grand escape, and his friends reunite with him. Malicia then tells that this is no longer about Mr. Bunnsy, she tells that it's about a cat and his rat friends, along with a human who plays a flute.

Maurice the cat tells the townspeople that they have rats and convinces them to pay for Keith, the pied piper, to lead them outside of the town, where they are revealed to be sentient and literate, working with Keith and Maurice to defraud the townsfolk.

They next head for the town of Bad Blintz, which suffers from a lack of food and where rat-catchers have been unable to find the reason for the disappearing food. Trying to infiltrate the tunnels under the city, the rats find a trap that captures rats alive with Darktan, their leader, trapped inside. Meanwhile, Maurice has entered the mayor's house and when Keith tries to find him, they meet Malicia, who deduces - after seeing a tap-dancing rat named Sardines - that they are behind the recent plague of rats in nearby towns and enlists them to help discover the reason behind the city's food shortage.

Their quest leads them to the local rat-catchers' headquarters, where they find a secret passage to the basement filled with food. They also find Darktan and the other rats coming from the tunnels with the trap they found. Maurice correctly guesses that the rat-catchers are trying to catch the rats alive to use them for entertainment, pitting dogs in rings with rats and betting on how fast they are killed. The rat-catchers catch Sardines and use him for the ring, but he is rescued by the others.

Poisoning the food with laxatives, Maurice, Keith, and Malicia force the rat-catchers to admit that they created a rat king when eight rats they left in a bucket got their tails knotted and developed an evil sentience, capable of controlling other rats. Maurice flees from the rat king while Keith and Malicia head to the woods to find the real pied piper and steal his magical flute, the only instrument known to kill a rat king. Meanwhile, the Big Boss, revealed to be the rat king in human clothes, has captured Peaches, one of the rats, so Dangerous Beans, the group's spiritual leader, tries to rescue her. Confronting the rat king, Maurice hits him with the money they swindled, allowing him to escape with the two rats.

In the woods, Keith and Malicia attempt to steal the flute from the sleeping piper, but he wakes up and tries to kill them. They are saved when the wind-up toy mouse Malicia previously took from Darktan distracts him long enough to lose the flute, allowing them to run back to the town with it.

Meanwhile, Maurice and the rats try to flee the city but are stopped by the rat king, who summons dozens of rats to make himself stronger. Maurice runs into the woods to find the two humans while the rats attempt to resist the rat king's call to merge with him. Keith and Malicia return, and he plays the flute correctly to beguile the rats away from the rat king's influence until only the king itself remains. The rat king uses the last of his power to freeze everyone in place, but Dangerous Beans breaks free. The rat king then telekinetically snaps his neck. Dangerous Beans reminds Maurice to be a cat, and he uses his bottled-up instincts to kill the rat king, mortally wounding himself in the process. When Death and the Death of Rats arrive to take Dangerous Beans and one of Maurice's lives, he trades one of his lives for Dangerous Beans' life, allowing both of them to wake up. Malicia and Keith also start a relationship.

With the rat king defeated and the food given back to the townspeople, the town and the rats come to an agreement. The rats get to live in the middle of town, and Bad Blintz becomes a tourist attraction with its talking rats, including a job for Keith as the town's official piper.

The post-credits scene refers to a special remembering of Terry Pratchett.

== Voice cast ==
- Hugh Laurie as Maurice
- Emilia Clarke as Malicia
- David Thewlis as Boss Man / Rat King
- Himesh Patel as Keith
- Gemma Arterton as Peaches
- Hugh Bonneville as The Mayor
- David Tennant as Dangerous Beans
- Rob Brydon as The Pied Piper
- Julie Atherton as Nourishing
- Ariyon Bakare as Darktan
- Joe Sugg as Sardines
- Peter Serafinowicz as Death

== Production ==
In June 2019, an animated film adaptation of Terry Pratchett's novel The Amazing Maurice and His Educated Rodents was announced. Additionally, Terry Rossio was stated to be the screenplay writer, Carter Goodrich the concept character designer, Toby Genkel the film's director, and Julia Stuart of SKY, Rob Wilkins of Narrativia, Emely Christians, Robert Chandler and Andrew Baker as producers and Louis Paltnoi and Mark Walker as executive producers. In October 2019, sales for the film began and art work from the production was released. The voice cast of Hugh Laurie, Emilia Clarke, David Thewlis, Himesh Patel, Gemma Arterton and Hugh Bonneville was announced in November 2020. David Tennant, Rob Brydon, Julie Atherton and Joe Sugg were added to the voice cast in May 2021.

Animation was provided by Squeeze Animation Studio in both its Quebec City and Montreal offices, alongside Red Star 3D in Sheffield and Studio Rakete in Hamburg.

=== Music ===
On 6 April 2021, Tom Howe was announced to composed the film's musical score. English singer-songwriter Gabrielle Aplin also contributed two tracks, "Side by Side" and "Be Yourself" to the original music soundtrack.

== Release ==
The Amazing Maurice had its premiere at the Manchester Animation Festival on 13 November 2022, and was released in United Kingdom on 16 December, by Sky Cinema. It was released in the United States by Viva Pictures on 3 February 2023, after being delayed from a 13 January 2023 release. It had its American premiere at the 2023 Sundance Film Festival.

=== Home media ===
The Amazing Maurice was released on DVD and Blu-ray by Dazzler Media (under license from Universal Pictures) on 1 May 2023.

== Reception ==
=== Box office ===
As of 4 April 2023, The Amazing Maurice has grossed $4.3 million in the United States and Canada, and $15.8 million in other territories, for a worldwide total of $21.1 million.

=== Critical response ===
Review aggregator website Rotten Tomatoes reports that 74% of 50 sampled critics gave the film a positive review, with an average rating of 6.3/10. The site's critical consensus reads, "You may not necessarily need to rush out and see it right meow, but The Amazing Maurice is a solid book adaptation that makes for fun family viewing." Metacritic, which uses a weighted average, assigned the film a score of 53 out of 100, based on 11 critics, indicating "mixed or average" reviews.

Guy Lodge of Variety said the film was "genuinely eccentric enough — with its sly talking cat, intrepid band of gold-hearted rats and chronic aversion to keeping the fourth wall intact — to come off as charming rather than smarmy." The Guardian's Cath Clarke gave the film 3/5 stars, writing, "This is a film with a lot of charm, and gives cinema its most lovable rats since Ratatouille. But I did wonder at points who the audience is." Paul Byrnes of The Sydney Morning Herald also gave the film 3/5 stars, calling it "funny, wacky, fast-paced and somewhat hollow" and "a tad shrill and exhausting, especially when non-stop talker Malicia arrives inside the frame, bouncing around like a caffeine-fuelled teen know-it-all."

Kevin Maher of The Times gave the film 2/5 stars, criticising what he called its "creaky gags about poststructural textual analysis" and adding, "This might not have mattered so much if the characters around Malicia were lively, witty or even, yes, animated. Instead these educated rodents are oddly interchangeable."

== Sequel ==
In October 2024, a sequel titled The Amazing Maurice 2 - The Waters of Life was announced to be in production and set for a release in 2027. Genkel will return to direct, with Giles New and Keiron Self coming on board as writers, and Christians, Baker, and Chandler returning as producers. German company Epsilon Film handles the worldwide sales.
