= Louise Dearman =

British actress and singer

- Born: 13 March 1979 (age 47); Bletchley, Buckinghamshire, England
- Occupations: Actress, singer
- Years active: 1998–present
- Known for: Being the first actress to play both Elphaba and Glinda in Wicked

Louise Dearman (born 13 March 1979) is a British actress and singer, perhaps best known for playing Glinda and Elphaba in the West End in Wicked, being the only actress to have played both roles in any production of Wicked full-time. She has a number of other professional stage and TV credits, such as Eva Perón in Evita, Sarah Brown and Miss Adelaide in Guys and Dolls, and Daisy Hilton in Side Show. She released her solo albums, You and I, Here Comes the Sun and It's Time, in 2005, 2012 and 2013 respectively.

== Early life ==
Dearman was born in Bletchley and grew up in Linslade, Bedfordshire, attending Linslade Middle School and Cedars Upper School. She first began dance lessons at the age of three, and started to consider a stage career after appearing as part of a children's choir in Joseph and the Amazing Technicolor Dreamcoat at the London Palladium when she was thirteen. She then went on to train at Laine Theatre Arts for three years from leaving school, where she won their Musical Theatre Award and Opera Award, and was a contemporary of fellow West End performer Kerry Ellis.

== Stage career ==
Immediately after graduating from Laine in 1998, Dearman joined the touring cast of Joseph and the Amazing Technicolor Dreamcoat as the Narrator. Then, after performing in the ensemble of Whistle Down the Wind in Bromley, she portrayed Jan in the Grease UK tour in 2000, which she later returned to in 2003 at the Victoria Palace Theatre. Other roles Dearman has portrayed have been Lucy Harris in the national tour of Jekyll & Hyde, Mimi and understudy to Miss Adelaide and Sarah Brown in Guys and Dolls at the Piccadilly Theatre (she then took over the role of Sarah Brown a year later in the touring production of the show), Debbie in Debbie Does Dallas: The Musical at the 2007 Edinburgh Festival, Eva Perón in the tour of Evita, and Grizabella in Cats in Cyprus.

Other stage credits include Kiss Me, Kate at the Victoria Palace Theatre, Christmas Cat and The Pudding Pirates (Highbarn, Great Bardfield), the Willian Finn revue Make Me a Song at the New Players Theatre, Belle in the workshops of new musical Only the Brave, and the workshop production of Brick by Brick. In addition to this, she has featured in a number of concerts; as a guest vocalist with Michael Ball in his Michael Ball: Past and Present tour, and in her one-woman concert You and I in multiple venues. Dearman has appeared in pantomime versions of Cinderella three times; as Cinderella in Stoke-On-Trent in 2007 and in Milton Keynes in 2009, and as the Fairy Godmother in Wimbledon in 2008.

On 29 March 2010, she replaced Dianne Pilkington as Glinda the Good Witch in the London production of Wicked. She starred alongside Rachel Tucker as Elphaba. The two had previously spoofed their roles a year earlier in So Jest End, a show parodying the West End. Dearman played her final performance in the production on 10 December 2011 and was succeeded by Gina Beck.

On 26 September 2010, Dearman joined composer Scott Alan at his concert Simply the Music of Scott Alan in London's New Players Theatre. The concert also featured Patina Miller, Shoshana Bean, Ashleigh Gray, Sierra Boggess, Jodie Jacobs, Alex Gaumond and Hadley Fraser.

On 13 May 2012, Dearman held a launch party for her new album Here Comes the Sun at Bush Hall in London. On 28 June 2012, Dearman participated in a workshop for a new musical comedy version of JM Barrie's Peter Pan, playing the role of Tinker Bell. The workshop took place at Lyric Theatre, London, alongside actors Tim Driesen, Gerard Carey and Lucy Sinclair.

=== Return to Wicked and subsequent career (2012–present) ===
On 2 August 2012, it was announced that Dearman would return to Wicked, but as Elphaba, replacing her former co-star Rachel Tucker, marking her the first, and as of 2020, only actress to have played both lead roles in the musical. Dearman's opening night as Elphaba was on 29 October 2012. She starred alongside Gina Beck as Glinda, with Ben Freeman as Fiyero. On 18 November 2013, she was replaced by Dutch actress Willemijn Verkaik in the role, ending her contract with the show.

On 2 August 2014, Dearman appeared at The Proms in a semi-staged production of the Cole Porter classic Kiss Me, Kate as Lois Lane, accompanied by the John Wilson Orchestra.

In April 2014, it was announced that Dearman would originate the role of Mrs D in a new musical production of The Water Babies which premiered at Curve theatre in Leicester, alongside fellow West End performers Tom Milner and Lauren Samuels.

On 18 December 2014 Dearman appeared in a concert for the Bournemouth Symphony Orchestra alongside Lance Ellington

In 2015, it was announced that Dearman would perform in a new show honouring Judy Garland. The Judy Garland Show premiered at the Edinburgh Playhouse on 8 May 2015, and also starred former X Factor runner-up Ray Quinn as well as Garland's own daughter Lorna Luft.

The same year, Dearman also appeared for a second time at The Proms, in a special concert honouring the music of Leonard Bernstein.

On 29 September, Dearman performed in a previously announced one-off concert with friend fellow Laine Theatre Arts student Kerry Ellis at the Prince Edward Theatre, the current home to Aladdin.

In November 2015, Dearman collaborated once again with the John Wilson Orchestra in a special one-off UK tour celebrating the music of George Gershwin, and shortly after was announced as a guest vocalist for Josh Groban's UK sell-out tour in Manchester, Birmingham, London and Paris.

In February 2016, it was announced that Dearman would be playing Miss Adelaide in the UK tour of Guys and Dolls. In August 2016, she sang for a third consecutive year at the BBC Proms with the John Wilson Orchestra in a special tribute concert to George and Ira Gershwin. She then appeared as Daisy Hilton in the U.K. Premiere of Side Show at the Southwark Playhouse in a limited six-week run from 21 October – 3 December 2016.

On 17 July 2019, Dearman was in Malta for the BBC Radio 2 concert Lights, Camera, Malta. She performed theme songs from blockbusters A Star Is Born, Frozen amongst several other popular soundtracks. She was accompanied by the BBC Concert Orchestra. Other performances on the night came from The New Victorians, Bradley Jaden and Hannah Waddingham.

Dearman headlined as Ruth in the Opera Holland Park revival of Wonderful Town which ran July 1–4, 2021.

In March 2025 it was announced that Dearman would join fellow Wicked stars Kerry Ellis and Rachel Tucker for a one-night-only concert titled Gravity, on 31 August 2025.

== Television ==
Dearman's first television appearance was as a singing customer in a KFC advert in 2005. More recently, she has appeared in Tonight's The Night with John Barrowman, and has embarked upon a presenting career, appearing as a presenter in Creative Pastimes, Where Can I Get One of Those?, Kitchen Secrets, Pets Paradise, and Beautiful You. She has also appeared in The Cherries, a pilot for Carlton TV. She also sings "Somebody to Love" in the Confused.com advert (2010) and "Chain Reaction" (2011) which debuted during the 2011 BRIT Awards. A third advert, a "confused karaoke" version of "YMCA", was also released in 2011.

== Theatre credits ==
Year	Title	Role	Theatre	Category
1998	Joseph and the Amazing Technicolor Dreamcoat	Narrator	UK tour	UK tour
2000	Grease	Jan	UK tour	UK tour
2001	Kiss me, Kate	Ensemble	Victoria Palace Theatre	West End
2003	Grease	Jan	Victoria Palace Theatre	West End
2008	Evita	Eva Perón	UK tour	UK tour
2010-11	Wicked	Glinda	Apollo Victoria Theatre	West End
2012	Evita	Eva Perón	UK tour	UK tour
2012-13	Wicked	Elphaba	Apollo Victoria Theatre	West End
2014	The Water Babies	Mrs D	Curve theatre	Regional
2016	Guys and Dolls	Miss Adelaide	UK tour	UK tour
2016	Side Show	Daisy Hilton	Southwark Playhouse	Off West End
2022	Emojiland: the musical	Princess	Garrick Theatre	West End
2024	Side Show	Daisy Hilton	London Palladium	West End

== Recordings ==
=== You and I ===
Dearman released her debut album You and I in 2005, with renditions of songs from well known musicals. The album was re-released in 2010 and was available to buy through the Ozdust Boutique at the Apollo Victoria Theatre, London.

No.	Title	Musical	Length
1.	"You and I"	Goodbye, Mr. Chips	2:26
2.	"Someone Like You"	Jekyll and Hyde	3:44
3.	"This is One of Those Moments"	Yentl	1:58
4.	"On My Own"	Les Misérables	3:15
5.	"Funny Honey"	Chicago	2:21
6.	"I'll Forget You"	The Scarlet Pimpernel	3:57
7.	"Can't Help Lovin' Dat Man"	Show Boat	2:16
8.	"Whistle Down the Wind"	Whistle Down the Wind	3:42
9.	"You Can Always Count on Me"	City of Angels	3:08
10.	"Fifty Percent"	Ballroom	2:56
11.	"Your Daddy's Son"	Ragtime	3:50
12.	"My Own Space"	The Act	2:53
Total length:			36:26

=== Here Comes the Sun ===
On 7 May 2012, Dearman released her new album named Here Comes the Sun.

No.	Title	Originally by	Length
1.	"Here Comes the Sun"	The Beatles	3:21
2.	"Squander"	Skunk Anansie	4:12
3.	"Time After Time"	Cyndi Lauper	4:03
4.	"Gravity"	Sara Bareilles	3:51
5.	"See the Day"	Dee C. Lee	3.56
6.	"Little Bird"	Annie Lennox	4:25
7.	"This House"	Alison Moyet	3:49
8.	"Uninvited"	Alanis Morissette	3:27
9.	"One Day I'll Fly Away"	Randy Crawford	3:41
10.	"Kissing You"	Des'ree	5:01
Total length:			37:86

=== It's Time ===
On 2 December 2013, shortly after leaving Wicked, Dearman released her third studio album, It's Time. The album is a collection of well known songs from musical theatre with orchestral arrangements. (N.B. track 11, "Tomorrow" is a bonus track, available only with pre-orders of the album).

No.	Title	Musical	Length
1.	"Home"	The Wiz	3:34
2.	"What I Did for Love"	A Chorus Line	3:50
3.	"I Dreamed a Dream"	Les Misérables	4:24
4.	"People"	Funny Girl	3:15
5.	"Send in the Clowns"	A Little Night Music	4:28
6.	"Astonishing"	Little Women	3:39
7.	"The Perfect Year"	Sunset Boulevard	3:40
8.	"A New Life"	Jekyll & Hyde	4:41
9.	"Tell Me on a Sunday"	Tell Me on a Sunday	3:36
10.	"Over the Rainbow"	The Wizard of Oz	3:48
11.	"Tomorrow"	Annie	2:56

It was announced on Dearman's website www.louisedearman.com that a fourth album is currently in production, due for release in summer 2017.

=== Concept albums ===
- LIFT: The Original Concept Album

=== Other recordings ===
- "In the Bleak Midwinter" / "A Winter's Tale" with Ashleigh Gray and Paul Spicer and "All Those Christmas Clichés" on the album Christmas in New York by the Notes From New York team
- "Sometimes" on the album Scrapbook: The Songs of Rob Archibald and Verity Quade
- "Free" with Stuart Matthew Price on the album All Things in Time by Stuart Matthew Price
- "Fallen" on the album More with Every Line – The Music of Tim Prottey-Jones by Tim Prottey-Jones
- "Breakeven", on the album Singers Inc. Sessions, Volume 1
- "And There It Is / Magic" with Julia Murney on the album Scott Alan Live
- "My Man" and "Forever Young" on the album Songs by Richard Beadle
- "Sex on Fire", "Live and Let Die" and "Dry County" on the album Chick Rock (Rock Divas)
- "Defying Gravity" from the Musical Wicked, included in the "Wicked Edition" of her album, Here Comes The Sun.
- In December 2014, she released a double album – together with fellow musical theatre stars Kerry Ellis and Ben Forster – of Alexander S. Bermange's three-person musical The Route To Happiness. This was made available as a deluxe 2-CD set and to download.
