= Madalena Alberto =

Portuguese actress and singer (born 1984)

- Alberto in 2026
- Born: 1984 (age 41–42); Lisbon, Portugal
- Education: Doreen Bird College
- Occupations: Actress; singer; songwriter
- Years active: 2001–present
- Website: madalenaalberto.com

Madalena Alberto (Lisbon, 1984) is a Portuguese actress, singer and songwriter who works mainly in musical theatre, including productions in London's West End. Her roles include Eva Perón in Evita, for which she was nominated at the 2015 WhatsOnStage Awards, Fantine in the 25th anniversary production of Les Misérables and Grizabella in Cats.

On television, her work includes the Portuguese telenovela Amor Amor (2021) on SIC and the second series of the British drama The Gold (2025) on BBC One. She also writes and performs her own songs.

== Early life and education ==
Alberto was born in Lisbon in 1984 and grew up in a small seaside town on the outskirts of the city. She began dancing at the age of six and studied at the Ana Mangericão Dance School in Cascais, where she also took drama classes.

At 17, after a week-long workshop given by Doreen Bird College at her dance school, she was offered a scholarship to study for a degree in performing arts at the college, on the outskirts of London.

She completed the three-year course, graduating with a degree in Dance and Performing Arts.

== Career ==
In 2001, before moving to London, she played Carla in the television film Querida Mãe, directed by José Sacramento, produced by SIC Filmes and broadcast on SIC; it was her first acting role.

In 2005, she made her professional debut in the United Kingdom in the pantomime Aladdin at The Old Vic in London, in a production starring Ian McKellen. That same year, she played Lucy in The Threepenny Opera at the Teatro Aberto in Lisbon. A year after finishing her course, she began writing songs, influenced by members of the band Tankus the Henge.

In 2007, she played Carmen Diaz in the UK tour of Fame, her first leading role, and Hunyak in Chicago in Kuala Lumpur. In 2008, she was part of the original cast of the London production of Zorro the Musical at the Garrick Theatre, as understudy for the role of Luisa. In 2009, she played Sam in Christopher Hamilton's musical Over the Threshold at the Edinburgh Festival in the summer; the show later transferred to the Jermyn Street Theatre in London.

In 2009, she played Fantine in the 25th anniversary production of Les Misérables, which opened in Cardiff on 22 December 2009, toured the United Kingdom and Paris, and closed at the Barbican Theatre in London on 2 October 2010. In 2010, she also took part in the musical's 25th anniversary concert at the O2 Arena in London, which was released on CD and DVD.

In 2011, she played Sonia in Stephen Schwartz's Godspell at the Union Theatre, directed by Michael Strassen. On 29 May that year, she performed with Ricardo Afonso and Sofia Escobar at the Golden Globes ceremony in Portugal. In 2012, she played Lucy in the first London production of Frank Wildhorn's Jekyll & Hyde at the same theatre, and gave her first concert in Spain, at La Cova del Drac in Barcelona, on 3 December.

In 2013, she played Édith Piaf in Pam Gems's Piaf at the Curve in Leicester, directed by Paul Kerrison. The same year, she played Eva Perón in the UK tour of Andrew Lloyd Webber and Tim Rice's Evita, produced by Bill Kenwright, with Marti Pellow as Che. The first leg of the tour opened at the New Wimbledon Theatre in London on 15 May 2013, visited cities including Glasgow and Liverpool, and ended in Peterborough on 9 November 2013. Also in 2013, she took part in the gala O Melhor dos Musicais no Coliseu at the Coliseu dos Recreios in Lisbon, under the musical direction of Nuno Feist.

In 2014, the second leg of the Evita tour ran from 22 January in Oxford to 19 July in Aylesbury, followed by a season at the Kursaal in Ostend, Belgium, from 29 July to 10 August, with Mark Powell as Che. That year, the production transferred to the West End, opening at the Dominion Theatre on 16 September for a limited run of 55 performances, again with Pellow. On 5 December, she was announced as a nominee for Best Actress in a Musical at the 15th WhatsOnStage Awards for her performance as Eva Perón, and she performed at the nominations launch at the Café de Paris in London.

The 2015 WhatsOnStage Awards ceremony took place on 15 February, and the award for Best Actress in a Musical went to Eva Noblezada for Miss Saigon. On 24 March, she gave a concert at L'Auditori in Barcelona. That year, she joined the cast of James Graham's play The Vote, directed by Josie Rourke at the Donmar Warehouse, as Maria Ferreira. The cast included Judi Dench, Mark Gatiss and Catherine Tate. The play ran from 24 April to 7 May 2015, when it was broadcast live on More4. On 25 July, she gave her first solo concert in London, Don't Cry for Me, at the St. James Studio, with musical direction by Alfonso Casado and a programme of musical theatre songs and her own compositions. From 23 October 2015 to 2 January 2016, she alternated the role of Grizabella in Andrew Lloyd Webber's Cats at the London Palladium.

In 2016, she played Carrie in Jeff Wayne's Musical Version of The War of the Worlds, the first staged version of the work, at the Dominion Theatre from 8 February to 30 April. In earlier versions, the character, fiancée of the Journalist (played by Liam Neeson as a hologram), had only been mentioned; in this production she sang and danced. That year, she also played Tina McCoy in The Fix at the Union Theatre and Nina in Lillian Hellman's The Autumn Garden at the Jermyn Street Theatre. On 19 December, she played the Ghost of Christmas Past in a concert staging of Alan Menken and Lynn Ahrens's A Christmas Carol at the Lyceum Theatre with the London Musical Theatre Orchestra.

She made a guest appearance in the BBC series Holby City as Christina Chapara, and played Polly in Pollyanna at the Tristan Bates Theatre.

In July 2017, she performed at the Jardins de Pedralbes Festival in Barcelona. In December, she returned to the role of Eva Perón in a new tour of Evita, which played at the Palace Theatre in Manchester, with Jeremy Secomb as Perón and Gian Marco Schiaretti as Che. In 2018, the tour included the musical's regional premiere at Dubai Opera from 22 January to 3 February, and went on to Glasgow, the Storyhouse in Chester in April, and venues in Luxembourg and Italy. She gave her final performance in the role on 2 June 2018. That year, she also played the title role in José Sanchis Sinisterra's ¡Ay, Carmela! at the Cervantes Theatre in London.

In 2019, she played Giulietta in Andrew Lloyd Webber's Aspects of Love at the Southwark Playhouse, and Gloria Fajardo in On Your Feet!, a musical about Gloria Estefan, at the London Coliseum, a role she continued on the UK tour until 2020. On 18 September 2020, she and John Addison presented the show Um Musical no Sofá, directed by Tânia Azevedo, at the Ateneu Comercial do Porto.

In 2021, she joined the cast of the SIC telenovela Amor Amor as Julieta Serrão, replacing Alexandra Lencastre. The same year, she played Velma Kelly in Chicago at the Ljubljana Festival, directed by Mykal Rand.

On 15 January 2022, she took part in the New Year concert organised by Almada City Council at the Academia Almadense, with Sofia Escobar, John Addison and Timothy Howar, accompanied by the Orquestra Promenade conducted by Élio Anes Leal. That year, she played Nettie Fowler in Carousel at the Kilworth House Theatre, and gave a solo concert in Lisbon at Avenew on 17 December, accompanied by a jazz trio with Pedro Alvadia on piano. She also appeared as Carla in the series Riches.

In 2023, she played Maggie in the premiere of Warner Brown's musical Killing the Cat at Riverside Studios in London, and Alice Bean in Maury Yeston's Titanic on a tour of several cities in China.

In 2025, she played DEA agent Gabriella Lunez in the second series of the BBC drama The Gold, and Angela in the miniseries O Arquiteto, created by Patrícia Müller and directed by João Maia, which premiered on TVI on 22 September 2025.

In 2026, she was among the performers announced for To Maury, With Love, a concert celebrating Maury Yeston's 80th birthday, held at the Theatre Royal, Drury Lane in London on 22 February.

She has performed her own songs in concerts in London, Lisbon and Barcelona. She is an associate artist of the Chaskis Theatre company.

== Personal life ==
Alberto settled in London after completing her degree. She speaks Portuguese and English. Around 2010, she began learning the guitar, which she uses to accompany her songs. In 2020, during the COVID-19 pandemic, she returned to Portugal.

== Stage ==
Year	Title	Role	Venue	Ref.
2005	Aladdin	Ensemble	The Old Vic, London	
2005	The Threepenny Opera	Lucy	Teatro Aberto, Lisbon	
2007	Fame	Carmen Diaz	UK tour	
2007	Chicago	Hunyak	Kuala Lumpur	
2008	Zorro the Musical	Luisa (understudy)	Garrick Theatre, London	
2009	Over the Threshold	Sam	Edinburgh Festival and Jermyn Street Theatre, London	
2009–2010	Les Misérables	Fantine	UK and Paris tour; Barbican Theatre, London	
2011	Godspell	Sonia	Union Theatre, London	
2012	Jekyll & Hyde	Lucy	Union Theatre, London	
2013	Piaf	Édith Piaf	Curve, Leicester	
2013–2014	Evita	Eva Perón	UK tour; Kursaal, Ostend; Dominion Theatre, London	
2015	The Vote	Maria Ferreira	Donmar Warehouse, London	
2015–2016	Cats	Grizabella (alternate)	London Palladium, London	
2016	Jeff Wayne's Musical Version of The War of the Worlds	Carrie	Dominion Theatre, London	
2016	The Fix	Tina McCoy	Union Theatre, London	
2016	The Autumn Garden	Nina	Jermyn Street Theatre, London	
2016	A Christmas Carol	Ghost of Christmas Past	Lyceum Theatre, London (concert)	
2017–2018	Evita	Eva Perón	UK and international tour	
2018	¡Ay, Carmela!	Carmela	Cervantes Theatre, London	
2019	Aspects of Love	Giulietta	Southwark Playhouse, London	
2019–2020	On Your Feet!	Gloria Fajardo	London Coliseum and UK tour	
2020	Um Musical no Sofá	Herself	Ateneu Comercial do Porto	
2021	Chicago	Velma Kelly	Ljubljana Festival	
2022	Carousel	Nettie Fowler	Kilworth House Theatre	
2023	Killing the Cat	Maggie	Riverside Studios, London	
2023	Titanic	Alice Bean	China tour	
—	Pollyanna	Polly	Tristan Bates Theatre, London	

== Television ==
Year	Title	Role	Notes	Channel	Ref.
2001	Querida Mãe	Carla	Television film	SIC	
2015	The Vote	Maria Ferreira	Live broadcast of the play	More4	
2021	Amor Amor	Julieta Serrão	Telenovela	SIC	
2022	Riches	Carla	Series	Prime Video	
2025	O Arquiteto	Angela	Miniseries	TVI	
2025	The Gold	Gabriella Lunez	Series 2	BBC One	

== Discography ==
=== Solo ===
- 2011: Foreign Sketches – Live Studio Recording
- 2012: Heart Condition (EP)
- 2014: Don't Cry for Me (BK Records)

=== Cast recordings and guest appearances ===
- 2010: Les Misérables Live! The 2010 Cast
- 2010: Les Misérables in Concert: The 25th Anniversary (CD and DVD)
- 2011: The Postman and the Poet (Jay Records)
- 2012: One Touch of Venus (Jay Records)
- 2015: Rise, by John Owen-Jones

== Awards and nominations ==
- 2015: Nominated for Best Actress in a Musical at the 15th WhatsOnStage Awards for Evita
