= Sabrina Aloueche =

English musical theatre actress

- Education: Sylvia Young Theatre School
- Occupations: Singer, actress
- Website: https://www.spotlight.com/2517-8979-8224

Sabrina Aloueche is an English musical theatre actress.

She trained at Sylvia Young Theatre School and furthered her training at Mountview academy

She is best known for her role as Scaramouche in the musical We Will Rock You which she played for 4 years. She also played Young Cosette and later returned to play Éponine in the London productions of Les Misérables for its 21st anniversary year.

She has premiered two shows from America:

Faith in Brooklyn the musical which had its European premier in 2019

and

Pippi in American Trailer Park the Musical at the Waterloo East Theatre in 2016

She has also performed as cover Florence in the English National Operas production of Chess at The London Coliseum.

Starred as Belle in Starlight Express at The Other Palace under the direction of Andrew Lloyd Webber and Arlene Phillips

smaller productions include:

The Politician in NHS the Musical at the Theatre Royal Plymouth.

Maureen in Rent at The Cockpit Theatre

Jenna in Sleeping Arrangements

== Theatre ==
Sabrina Aloueche grew up listening to movie musicals, especially Annie. Inspired by the singing and dancing, she attended Sylvia Young Theatre School. When she was seven years old, she was cast as Young Cosette at the Palace Theatre's production of Les Misérables. As a teenager, she made many TV appearances and especially enjoyed acting in drama shows. Aloueche later played the part of Éponine in Les Misérables at the Queen's Theatre where she was also cast to play the same part in the 21st anniversary show that was recorded for a BBC radio broadcast. On 2008, Aloueche began her run as Scaramouche in Ben Elton and Brian May’s We Will Rock You, the role she is best known for. She also originated the role of Belle in the workshop of Starlight Express under the direction of Andrew Lloyd Webber.
