= Erin Murray Quinlan =

American writer and theatre composer

Erin Murray Quinlan is an American writer and composer for theatre, most notably Brain Hemingway, which premiered Off-Broadway at the Players Theatre in 2024, and God Save Queen Pam which debuted Off-Broadway at the Players Theatre in 2018 and was published by Roger Bean and Steele Spring Stage Rights in 2019.

== Education ==
Quinlan graduated from Berklee College of Music in 2009. She also studied composition at Philip Lasser's EAMA Nadia Boulanger Institute with Michel Merlet. She is an alumna of the BMI Lehmen Engel Musical Theatre Workshop.

== Career ==
Quinlan's musical about Ernest Hemingway and his four marriages, Hemingway's Wife, was produced at the Players Ring in 2015. It received mixed reviews. That year, Quinlan also wrote music and lyrics and co-wrote the script (with Larry Tish and Lee Goodwin) to Jews on First, a trunk show about Jewish baseball players commissioned by Larry Ruttman, using stories from his book, American Jews and America's Game. Its NYC premiere was at the American Jewish Historical Society in 2016. She also co-wrote lyrics and wrote the music to "How Can I Tell You" on Rory Sherman's album MS. A Song Cycle, which benefitted the MS Society UK and included compositions from Bree Lowdermilk, George Macguire, Robert J. Sherman, George Stiles, and Sarah Travis. It was sung by West End star Julie Atherton.

In 2018, God Save Queen Pam had its Off-Broadway debut at the Players Theatre, to which Quinlan wrote the music, lyrics, and book. It opened to generally positive reviews, holding a 75 rating on Show-Score. It was published by Roger Bean and Steele Spring Stage Rights in 2019.

In 2020, Quinlan wrote the score to the film Bad Cupid starring John Rhys Davis.

Quinlan’s musical Brain Hemingway, a comedy based on her experiences writing about American author Ernest Hemingway and starring her husband Evan Quinlan as Hemingway, opened at Edinburgh Festival Fringe in the summer of 2022, and returned in 2023 to rave reviews. From there, it transferred to London’s Etcetera Theatre, with a repeat London run in 2024 at the Canal Cafe Theatre. It premiered at The Players Theatre Off-Broadway in 2024.
