= The Vote =

2015 play by James Graham

- Written by: James Graham
- Music by: Michael Bruce
- Setting: 7 May 2015, London polling station

Premiere
- Date: 24 April 2015
- Place: Donmar Warehouse, London
- Directed by: Josie Rourke

The Vote is a 2015 play by British playwright James Graham. The play received its world premiere at the Donmar Warehouse as part of their spring 2015 season, where it ran from 24 April to 7 May 2015. Directed by Josie Rourke and set in a fictitious London polling station on election night 2015, the play was broadcast live on UK television channel More4 on the night of the election.

In 2019, the play was updated into a rehearsed reading production for that year's general election.

== Production history ==
The Vote was written by playwright James Graham. On 3 November 2014, it was announced the play would premiere as part of the Donmar Warehouse's spring 2015 season and would begin previews at the Donmar Warehouse, London on 24 April with an official opening, and final night on 7 May 2015. Tickets for the play's short run were made available through a ballot. In addition to its theatre showing, a live broadcast of the play aired on the UK television channel More4 on the night of the election.

The Vote is set in a polling station in Lambeth, during the final 90 minutes of polling for the 2015 general election on 7 May 2015, meaning it was the first ever play broadcast live at the exact time it was set. The broadcast attracted 555,000 viewers at its peak, making it the most viewed production in the history of the Donmar Warehouse. The broadcast was filmed using fixed-rig cameras, similar to those used in television shows such as One Born Every Minute, rather than conventional filming methods.

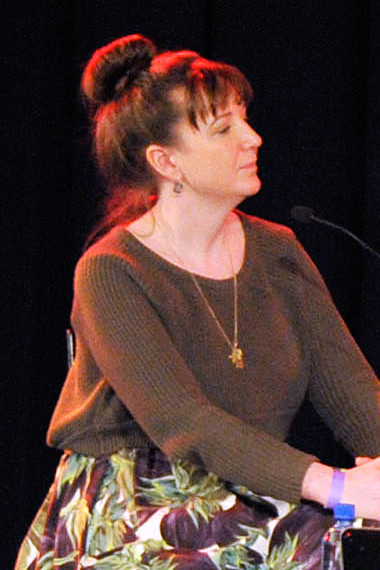
The play's director Josie Rourke

The play was directed by Josie Rourke, with design by Robert Jones, lighting design by Oliver Fenwick, movement by Stephen Mear, composition by Michael Bruce and sound design by Nick Lidster. The work which had been in development for a year previous reunited the Donmar Warehouse's artistic director Rourke with writer James Graham, who last worked together on the play Privacy, which also premiered at the Donmar.

The play featured an ensemble cast of around 40, including Catherine Tate, Mark Gatiss, Timothy West, Nina Sosanya and Bill Paterson. Judi Dench also starred alongside her real life daughter Finty Williams for the first time, playing a mother and daughter and marking her first performance at the theatre since 1976.

A typical performance ran 90 minutes, with no interval.

Describing the live broadcast, director Rourke said, "This is a unique opportunity for the Donmar to make a small theatre feel very big", whilst writer Graham added that he hoped to illuminate the "diverse, diligent and often hilarious individuals" who turn the "unglamourous" settings of polling stations into "places where history is made".

In 2019, the play was updated into a one-off rehearsed reading production for that year's general election, held on 12 December at Bush House. All the original cast members reprised their roles, with the exception of Judi Dench, Timothy West, Bhasker Patel, Kadiff Kirwan, Alice Hewkin, Madalena Alberto and Chukwudi Iwuji, who were respectively replaced by Susan Brown, Gawn Grainger, Sartaj Garewal, Calvin Demba, Shaofan Wilson, Lisa Caruccio Came and Nonso Anozie. James Graham himself read out the lines of Catherine Tate's character's brother, Colin Henderson, while Simon Russell Beale was the narrator. Rourke said that putting the show in 2015 was the most fun she's ever had in a theatre, adding that "it's glorious to bring so many of these actors back together, and I hope it's a reunion that becomes a tradition."

== Cast ==
=== Main cast ===
- Mark Gatiss as Steven Crosswell, a presiding officer of the polling station
- Catherine Tate as Kirsty Henderson, a poll clerk
- Nina Sosanya as Laura Williams, a poll clerk

=== Supporting cast ===
As listed in order of speaking on the Donmar Warehouse's website.

- Llewella Gideon as Grace Botchway
- Timothy West as Fred Norris
- Bhasker Patel as Pravin Shah
- Fisayo Akinade as Jonathan Clarke
- Kadiff Kirwan as Jerome Hanikie
- MyAnna Buring as Tilde Larson
- Wanda Opalinska as Alexandra Peters
- Pandora Colin as Rochena Peters
- Hadley Fraser as Alastair Swift
- Aicha Kossoko as Alia Aminu
- Gerard Horan as Alan Walker
- Prasanna Puwanarajah as Tom Baird
- Rita Balogun as Jasmine Lennon
- Alice Hewkin as Carla Wu
- Stavros Demetraki as Paul Alleyne
- Michael Shaeffer as Gerry Henderson
- Tommy French as Lucas Henderson
- Nicholas Burns as Kenneth Robson
- Rosalie Craig as Louisa Robson
- Madalena Alberto as Maria Ferreira
- Jade Anouka as PC Chika Devan
- Paul Chahidi as Howard Roberts
- Stephen Kennedy as Stuart Coghlan
- Judi Dench as Christine Metcalf
- Finty Williams as Lola Parkes
- Chukwudi Iwuji as Adeyami Abudu
- Bill Paterson as Simon Featherstone
- Rachel Denning as Claire Dunn
- Jackie Clune as Maggie Tann
- Heather Craney as Terri Fletcher
- Yusra Warsama as Hanni Yonis
- Joanna Griffin as Sally Dodds
- Beverley Longhurst as Katie Dahl
- Andrew McDonald as Anthony Lester
- Penny Ryder as Emma Watts
- Eddie Arnold as Daniel Moreno

=== Cameo appearance ===
The cameo role of Kirsty's in-law, Colin/Coleen Henderson, was played by a different guest actor at each performance.

- Elliot Levey (April 24)
- Ralf Little (April 25)
- Michelle Terry (April 27)
- Julian Ovenden (April 28)
- Ian Hallard (April 29)
- Andrew Scott (April 29)
- Russell Tovey (April 30)
- Geoffrey Streatfeild (May 1)
- Kit Harington (May 2)
- Simon Russell Beale (May 4)
- Marc Elliott (May 5)
- Patrick Marber (May 5)
- Amanda Abbington (May 6)
- Jude Law (in a live television broadcast on May 7)
