= Mark Kidel =

British documentary filmmaker and writer (born 1947)

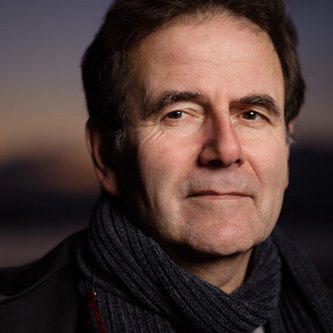
- Born: 6 July 1947 (age 79); London, England
- Education: BA
- Alma mater: Oxford University (UK)
- Occupations: Documentary filmmaker, writer
- Notable work: Rod the Mod Has Come of Age, Boy Next Door, Naked and Famous, Balthus the Painter, Ravi Shankar, Alfred Brendel: Man and Mask

Mark Kidel (born 6 July 1947) is a documentary filmmaker, writer and critic, working mostly in France and the UK.
His award-winning films include portraits of Cary Grant, John Adams, Elvis Costello, Boy George, Ravi Shankar, Rod Stewart, Bill Viola, Iannis Xenakis, pianists Alfred Brendel and Leon Fleisher, Derek Jarman, Brian Clarke Balthus, Tricky, Robert Wyatt and American theatre and opera director Peter Sellars.

A pioneer of the "rockumentary", Kidel was also the first rock critic of the New Statesman and contributed pieces on rock, soul, and world music, to The Observer, The Sunday Times, and The Guardian.

== Early life ==
Kidel grew up in Paris and Vienna and attended the Lycée français de Vienne and Bedales School in England. In 1965, he won a scholarship to the University of Oxford where he studied for a BA in Philosophy, Politics and Economics at New College, graduating in 1968, and edited Isis, the renowned student weekly. During his tenure, Kidel interviewed Jimi Hendrix on his first UK tour with Emma Rothschild. Kidel subsequently earned a scholarship to the University of Pennsylvania, graduating in 1969 with an MA in International Relations.

== Early film and television career ==
In 1970 Kidel got a job at the BBC in London as a researcher in the General Features department. There he made his first 10-minute film (about cheap weekend holidays to Majorca), and in 1972 joined the production team on the newly formed BBC2 Saturday night program Full House later known as Second House and The Lively Arts. There he made longer film portraits of a variety of British artists and craftsmen.

He followed with the feature-length The Man They Couldn't Hang: Babbacombe Lee for the BBC with the folk-rock group Fairport Convention.

In 1975 Kidel made a cinéma vérité film about the Kursaal Flyers called So You Wanna Be a Rock 'N' Roll Star? Recognized as a pioneering rock doc who inspired British comedians' group the Comic Strip's Bad News Tour. It also inspired Rob Reiner's This is Spinal Tap.

Kidel's next film, another classic rock doc, Rod the Mod Has Come of Age was 'a ruthless account of the rock promotion circus in full action'. In early 1976, Kidel was in charge of "Arena: Art and Design", one of the precursors of the long-running BBC Arena series. During his six-month editorship, "Arena" featured an entire program devoted to video art, a then-relatively new art movement.

== Dartington Hall and work with James Hillman ==
In 1976, frustrated by what he saw as television's increasing superficiality and the professional pressure to make formulaic films to please as wide an audience as possible, Kidel left the industry altogether to work in communications and public relations for the Dartington Hall Trust in Devon, a role he occupied for the next decade. Dorothy Whitney Elmhirst and her husband Leonard's non-profit foundation was influenced by Rabindranath Tagore and served as an experiment in rural reconstruction which included projects in education, agriculture, rural industry and the arts. Over this period, Kidel also taught in the music department at Dartington College of the Arts, for three years.

Kidel was director of the "New Themes for Education" conference held at Dartington Hall for the years from 1984 to 1986. During this time, the conference explored the experience of illness and brought together people from the worlds of medicine, psychology and the arts. The 1985 conference led to Kidel's co-editing with Susan Rowe-Leete, The Meaning of Illness (Routledge and Kegan Paul, London, 1986).

Kidel invited James Hillman to Dartington Hall in 1984 to run a weekend seminar on animals in myths, dreams and fairy tales. Following this they collaborated, with Susan Rowe-Leete, on seven films based on Hillman's ideas:

- The Heart Has Reasons: a film about the way in which the heart is imagined by scientists and poets
- Kind of Blue: an essay in defence of melancholia
- The Architecture of the Imagination: a series of five ground-breaking films, 30-minutes each, about architecture and symbolism, with ones about the doorway, the staircase, the window, the tower and the bridge. The films included many examples drawn from the history of art and classic cinema.

== Music criticism ==
From 1972 to 1976, Kidel wrote music reviews for Time Out's music section.

During his time in Devon and onwards, Kidel produced more writing on contemporary music, specifically rock, folk, soul, R&B, blues, and world music, contributing pieces to The Observer, The Sunday Times, The Guardian and the New Review. He was the founding rock columnist for the New Statesman in 1976 through 1980 and alternated every other week with John Peel on a regular column in The Listener.

== WOMAD ==
Kidel and Peter Gabriel, with whom he had become friends after interviewing him for The Observer, discovered they were both interested in exploring music from other cultures. This led to a collaboration on the creation of a world music and rock festival that eventually became WOMAD. Kidel fed ideas which came from looking at successful world music festivals in France, the yearly event in Rennes, run by Chérif Khaznadar and Françoise Gründ. Kidel was on the first board of directors but resigned owing to other commitments. A group that included Jonathan Arthur, Thomas Brooman, Martin Elbourne, Bob Hooton, and Steve Pritchard eventually brought the festival to fruition in 1982.

== Return to television ==
In 1987, Kidel returned to television: That year, he worked as joint commissioning editor-in-chief for the inaugural broadcast of the French cultural channel La Sept – later known as ARTE France. He also worked as a consultant to Channel 4, BBC Wales, and United Television, a large UK-based independent producer of TV programmes, through 2004. Kidel also produced and directed many films from 1987 until the present, working in collaboration with a number of production companies, in the UK – Dibb Directions, Third Eye and Antelope Films – in France with Les Films d'ici, and Agat Films & Cie – Ex Nihilo and also a regular guest producer with the BBC's Music and Arts Department.

One notable project involved collaborating with British producer and director Mike Dibb and the world-renowned American ethnomusicologist Alan Lomax – creating two films for Channel 4 out of 500 or so hours of material he had shot in the United States over a 10-year period: American Patchwork and Dreams and Songs of the Noble Old.

Many of Kidel's most successful films in the field of world music and cultures have been the result of collaborations with distinguished specialists: Le Paris Black and Pygmies in Paris with French music writer (and ex-editor of Jazz Magazine) Gérald Arnaud, Under African Skies: Mali and Bamako Beat with ethnomusicologist and BBC broadcaster Lucy Durán , and New York:, The Secret African City with the Yale Africanist Robert Farris Thompson.

== Move to role as self-shooting director ==
A major shift occurred in Kidel's work starting in 1997: he started shooting his own films. The intimacy achieved in "Naked and Famous", his film about Tricky, owed a great deal to this new low-impact approach. Subsequently, Kidel shot many of his own films or the parts of them using this approach.

== Current work ==
Kidel founded the production company Calliope Media in 2003. Calliope Media was renamed Mark Kidel Films in 2022. He continues to work as a freelance director, mainly in the UK and France. Recent films include Becoming Cary Grant (2017), an official selection at the 2017 Cannes Festival, The Juilliard Experiment (2016), a feature-length film about the French artist Fabienne Verdier's collaborations with musicians in New York. Current projects include a feature documentary about Leonard Cohen, co-written with Sylvie Simmons, author of the acclaimed biography and 'I'm You Man, a film about the French pianist Shani Diluka as well as other music and arts projects. He is an active freelance writer, notably writing for Dasha Zhukova's art magazine Garage and Doris Lippitsch's architecture and design magazine QUER. He is a regular contributor on music, film and theatre for The Arts Desk, an online review of the arts founded in September 2009 by a group of freelance arts writers.

== Selected awards ==
- Grierson Award for the Best History Documentary, 2007, for Hungary 1956: Our Revolution
- FIPA D'Argent Special Prize, Biarritz, 2002, for Ravi Shankar: Between Two Worlds
- Grand Prix, Classiques en Images festival, Paris, 2002, for Leon Fleisher: Lessons of a Master
- Royal Television Society Award, 1995, for Kind of Blue
- Liliane Stewart Prize for Design Arts, Festival International du Film Sur L'art, Montreal, 2011, for the documentary "Colouring Light: Brian Clarke – An Artist Apart"

== Personal life ==
Kidel has been married twice. His first marriage was to Caroline Wyndham, who had a daughter Sarah, whom Kidel adopted. The couple subsequently had Leo and Chloe. His second marriage was to Susan Rowe-Leete, from whom he was divorced in 2018. They have two children, Sam and Anna.

== Filmography ==
=== 75 min and over ===
- The Man They Couldn't Hang: Babbacombe Lee, 1974, 90 min
- So You Wanna Be A Rock'n'Roll Star (The Kursaal Flyers), 1975, 90 min
- Rod the Mod Has Come of Age (Rod Stewart), 1976, 90 min
- Les Hopitaux Meurent Aussi (A Hospital Remembers), 2000, 77 min – Selection Hot Docs, Toronto
- Alfred Brendel: Man and Mask, 2000, 75 min
- Ravi Shankar: Between Two Worlds, 2001, 90 min – Telluride Film Festival selection, 2001; FIPA D'Argent Special Prize; Grand Prix du Documentaire, UNESCO Festival International du Film d'Art; World Culture Forum Vienna TV Award; Newport International Film Festival; San Francisco International Film Festival, all 2002
- Glastonbury, 2002, 2 hrs
- Paris Brothel, 2003, 75 min
- Soweto Strings in Performance, 2007 – Selection FIPA, Biarritz; DokuArts, Amsterdam, both 2008
- Soweto Strings, 2007, 89 min – Best Arts Documentary nomination, Grierson Awards, 2007
- Journey With Peter Sellars, 2007, 90 min – Telluride Film Festival selection, 2007; San Francisco International Film Festival selection, 2008; Golden Prague nomination, 2008
- Set the Piano Stool on Fire, 2010, 77 min
- Elvis Costello: Mystery Dance, 2013, 90 min
- The Juilliard Experiment, 2016, 90 min
- Becoming Cary Grant, 2017, 85 min, Official Selection Cannes Festival 2017

=== 60 min ===
- American Patchwork, 1988
- Songs and Dreams of the Noble Old, 1988
- New York: The Secret African City, 1989
- Under African Skies: Rai, 1989 – Selection Suoni dal Mondo, Firenze, 1998
- Under African Skies: Mali, 1989 – Selection Suoni dal Mondo, Firenze, 1998
- Under African Skies: Algeria, 1989
- Le Paris Black, 1990 – Selection Suoni dal Mondo, Firenze, 1998
- Something Rich and Strange: The Life and Work of Iannis Xenakis, 1991
- Derek Jarman: A Portrait, 1991 – Selection FIFA, Montreal, 1992
- Boy Next Door (Boy George), 1994 – Selection FIFA, Montreal, 1995
- Edgard Varèse, 1995 – Selection FIFA, Montreal, 1997
- Norman Foster, 1995
- Balthus the Painter, 1996 – Biennale Internationale du Film sur l'Art, Paris, official selection, 1996; FIFA, Montreal, 1997
- Wild Ballerina: Karole Armitage, 1997
- Naked and Famous: Tricky, 1997
- Leon Fleisher: Lessons of a Master, 2001 – Classiques en Images festival Grand Prix, 2002; Grand Prix Musique, UNESCO Festival International du Film d'Art, 2002
- Ravi Shankar in Concert, 2002
- Free Will and Testament: The Robert Wyatt Story, 2002
- Bill Viola: The Eye of the Heart, 2003 – Selection FIFA, Montreal, 2004
- Imber: England's Lost Village, 2004
- Joe Zawinul: A Musical Portrait, 2005
- Susheela Raman: Indian Journey, 2005
- Mario Lanza: Singing to the Gods, 2005
- Hungary 1956: Our Revolution, 2006 – Grierson Award for Best History Documentary; Historical Film of the Year Award, History Today Awards, both 2007
- Leon Fleisher: A Fleur De Touches (Two Hands), 2007
- Saved By Music: The Wallfisch Family, 2010
- Colouring Light: Brian Clarke – An Artist Apart, 2011
- Fabienne Verdier: Painting the Moment, 2013
- Road Movie: A Portrait of John Adams, 2013 – Selection at FIFA (Montreal), 2013 and Telluride Film Festival, 2013
- Martin Amis's England, 2014

=== 50 and 52 min ===
- Sounds Off the Beaten Track: WOMAD, 1987, 52 min
- Bamako Beat: Music From Mali, 1991, 50 min
- Pygmies in Paris, 1992, 45 min
- The Heart Has Reasons, 1993, 52 min
- Kind of Blue: An Essay on Melancholia and Depression, 1994, 52 min – Telluride Film Festival selection, 1993
- Dreamtown: An Anatomy of Blackpool, 1995, 50 min – Golden Gate Awards Certificate of Merit, San Francisco International Film Festival, 1996
- Just Dancing Around: Richard Alston, 1996, 52 min
- Tricky Live, 1997, 50 min
- Brendel in Performance, 2000, 50 min
- The Island of 1000 Violins, 2015, 52 min

=== 30 min and less ===
- The Architecture of the Imagination, 1994: The Door, The Staircase, The Window, The Bridge, and The Tower (5 films, 30 min each)
- Karole Armitage: Rave, 2003, 26 min
- Henri Oguike: Second Frame, 2006, 26 min

=== Collaborations ===
- A Maybe Day in Kazakhstan, co-directed with Tony Harrison – Telluride Film Festival selection, 1994
- Alfred Brendel on Music: Three Lectures, 2011, 225 min

== Books ==
- Dartington (Webb & Bower, Exeter, 1983)
- Learning by Doing (Green Books, Hartland)

=== Co-authored with Susan Rowe-Leete ===
- The Meaning of Illness (Routledge and Kegan Paul, London, 1986)
- "Mapping the Body" (photo essay) in Zone 3: Fragments for a History of the Human Body, Part 1, ed. by Michel Feher, Ramona Naddaff, and Nadia Tazi (Zone Books, 1989), ISBN 978-0-942299-25-0
