= Julie Atherton =

British actress

- Born: Preston, Lancashire, England
- Occupations: Actress, singer

Julie Atherton is a British actress, singer and director. She is best known for originating the role of Kate Monster and Lucy the Slut in the West End production of Avenue Q and playing Sister Mary Robert in the first UK tour of Sister Act: The Musical. As a singer she released her debut album, A Girl of Few Words, on 2 October 2006.

== Biography ==
=== Training ===
Atherton grew up in Preston, Lancashire, England and started her training at Cardinal Newman College before moving to Mountview Academy of Theatre Arts. She graduated in 1999. Whilst training at Mountview, she played Fern in Charlotte's Web at the Polka Theatre in Wimbledon, London.

== Theatre credits ==
After her training, Atherton played Iris Bentley in Let Him Have Justice, which she co-wrote. She was later cast in the lead role of Sophie in the West End production of Mamma Mia! (2000), and then as Serena Katz in the national tour of Fame. A season was then spent appearing in Out of This World at the Chichester Festival Theatre and as the Kolokolo Bird in the Stiles and Drewe musical Just So (2004). She was part of the premiere of a new musical Ordinary Days at the Finborough Theatre, and Once Upon A Time At The Adelphi at the Liverpool Playhouse from 28 June 2008 to 2 August 2008.

In June 2006, Atherton became part of the original London cast of Avenue Q when the show transferred from Broadway to the Noël Coward Theatre in the West End. She originated the roles of Kate Monster/Lucy the Slut in the West End production, and continued in the show until 1 December 2007. She returned to the production, which had then moved to the Gielgud Theatre, in December 2008 and continued playing her roles until 3 October 2009. Part of the cast were also Giles Terera as Gary Coleman and Sion Lloyd as Brian, who both trained at Mountview with Atherton.

Subsequently, in 2009, she created the role of Charlotte in the new musical Through the Door by British composer/lyricist Laurence Mark Wythe and American bookwriter Judy Freed, at the Trafalgar Studios in a West End production. In 2010 she appeared in the musical Tomorrow Morning at the Landor Theatre in South London, the award winning musical by Laurence Mark Wythe.

In the same year she appeared in Jonathan Larson's tick, tick... BOOM! which played at the Duchess Theatre, having its West End premiere.

During the months of February and March 2011, Atherton starred alongside her Avenue Q castmate, Daniel Boys, in Ordinary Days at the Trafalgar Studios.

From 29 September 2011, Atherton played the role of Sister Mary Robert in the first UK tour of Sister Act the Musical. Sister Act toured throughout the UK and Ireland.

In February 2013 she appeared in Craig Adams' musical Lift, which ran at the Soho Theatre in London. Atherton studied at Mountview with Adams and was one of the first people to be introduced to the musical.

Also in 2013, Atherton played Emily in The Hired Man, alongside David Hunter for its UK tour at Colchester Mercury and at the Curve Theatre in Leicester.

Atherton starred in the new musical, The Opinion Makers alongside Daniel Boys, a coproduction between the Mercury Theatre, Colchester and Derby Theatre.

Atherton was included on the album MS. A Song Cycle, a musical theatre album benefitting the MS Society UK. Her song 'How Can I Tell You' was written by American composer Erin Murray Quinlan, with lyrics co-written by Rory Sherman.

Atherton starred as Janet Majors in the world premiere stage production of Shock Treatment, the musical sequel to The Rocky Horror Picture Show, at the King's Head Theatre Pub in Islington.

In 2017 Atherton joined the London cast of The Grinning Man as Queen Angelica. The show played at the Trafalgar Studios, after a transfer from Bristol Old Vic.

Atherton was part of the cast of the 2022 Bridge Theatre production of Philip Pullman's The Book of Dust, directed by Nicholas Hytner and adapted by Bryony Lavery.

=== Stage credits ===
Year	Title	Role	Theatre	
1999	Charlotte's Web	Fern	Polka Theatre	
2000	Mamma Mia	Sophie	Prince Edward Theatre	
	Fame	Serena Katz	UK tour	
2005	Just So	Kolokolo Bird	Chichester Festival Theatre	
2006 - 2007	Avenue Q	Kate Monster / Lucy the Slut	Noël Coward Theatre	
2011	Ordinary Days	Deb	Trafalgar Studios	
2011	Sister Act	Sister Mary Robert	UK tour	
2013	Lift	French Teacher	Soho Theatre	
2013	The Hired Man	Emily	UK tour	
2017	The Grinning Man	Queen Angelica	Trafalgar Studios	
2022	The Book of Dust	Hyena, Stelmaria (Asriel's dæmon), Sister Paulina	Bridge Theatre	
2024	Just for One Day	Margaret Thatcher	The Old Vic	
2025	Just for One Day	Margaret Thatcher	Ed Mirvish Theatre, Toronto	Shaftesbury Theatre

=== Filmography ===
Year	Title	Role	Notes
2013	Lift	French teacher	Video
2014	BBC Comedy Feeds	Su, Doll and Mum	TV series (1 episode)
2015	The Sound of Music Live	Sister Margaretta	
2018	Skakespeare & Hathaway: Private Investigators	Antonia Briars	TV series (1 episode)
2019	The Eight of March	Hodge (voice)	Podcast series (1 episode)
2020	Monty & co.	Singing Petals (voice)	TV series
2022	The National Theatre Live: The Book of Dust La Belle Sauvage	Hyena, Stelmaria (Asriel's dæmon), Sister Paulina	
2022	Slow Horses	Melanie	TV series (1 episode)
2022	Casualty	Amy Baxter	TV series (1 episode)
2022	The Amazing Maurice	Nourishing (voice)	
2024	Doctors	Jax 'Jennifer', Naomi Curtis, Poppy Wearing	TV series (3 episodes)
2024	Dead	Lesley	TV series (1 episode)

=== Notes From New York ===
Atherton is a founding member of the company of Notes From New York, bringing the works of US composers to the West End stage. She has performed in five of the six Notes From New York shows to date and appeared in the one off special Christmas in New York, part of the series, held at the Lyric Theatre on 9 December 2007.

As part of Notes From New York, a production of The Last Five Years was held on three consecutive Sundays from 12 October 2008 at the Theatre Royal Haymarket. The show also played for one week in May 2009 at the Duchess Theatre.

== Michael Bruce - Unwritten Songs ==
Atherton features as a performer on the album Unwritten Songs with "Portrait of a Princess". The album was launched in April on Speckulation's website.

The song is also featured on Atherton's website and available on Michael Bruce - Unwritten Songs. Atherton has performed it live at the Apollo Theatre twice as well as in the Delfont room, in London's West End.

== Other Ventures ==
Atherton is also a singer and released three solo albums, A Girl of Few Words (2006), No Space for Air (2010) and Rush of Life (2014). She performed at various venues, including her largest solo performance at the Apollo Theatre in London, where she performed hits from her second CD as well as reuniting and performing with Kate Monster and Daniel Boys, and appearing with special guests Richard Fleeshman, Michael Bruce and Lance Horne.

Atherton recently appeared as a headline performer alongside Ruthie Henshall and Aled Jones in Adam Hepkin's The Magic of the Musicals and as part of the Giggin' for Good concert series at the Actor's Church, Covent Garden.

She is also an emerging director and has directed of shows and musicals, including Bare: a Pop Opera, Game Theory, Ordinary Days and Club Mex at Hope Mill Theatre, Manchester. In 2023 she directed Alice Fearn in Christopher J Orton and Jon Robyns's Then, Now and Next at the Southwark Playhouse, Borough. Also in 2023, she directed the UK premiere of The Hello Girls at the University of Central Lancashire, as a guest director for the third year final shows.

== A Girl of Few Words ==
A Girl of Few Words

Studio album by Julie Atherton
- Released: 3 October 2006
- Genre: pop
- Length: 40:06
- Label: MaKiNG Records

Julie Atherton chronology
A Girl of Few Words	No Space for Air

Atherton released her first solo album on 3 October, 2006. The music was composed by Charles Miller with lyrics by Kevin Hammonds and Adam Bard.

Track Listing

- "A Girl of Few Words"
- "If You Were Mine"
- "Let Me Inside"
- "He Wasn't You"
- "Be Careful"
- "Not Afraid Anymore"
- "Somebody's Falling"
- "Someone Find Me" (featuring Paul Spicer)
- "Clockwork"
- "Heaven Knows"
- "Home"
- "You Know How to Love Me"

== No Space for Air ==
No Space for Air

Studio album by Julie Atherton
- Released: 6 June 2010
- Genre: Musical Theatre
- Label: Speckulation Entertainment
- Producer: Speckulation Entertainment

Julie Atherton chronology
Girl of Few Words	No Space for Air	There's a Fine Fine Line (CD Single)

In June 2010, Atherton released her second studio album, No Space for Air. Described as "a unique and groundbreaking album for the Spring Awakening and Lady Gaga generation", No Space for Air features material from Alanis Morissette, Skunk Anansie and Stephen Sondheim.

Track Listing

- "Weak"
- "Blind"
- "Lost in Translations"
- "Crawling"
- "Never Saw Blue Like That"
- "Broken Wings"
- "Losing My Mind"
- "Leather"
- "Silent Whispers"
- "Anywhere But Here"
- "Encore"
- "Annie's Song" (Hidden Track)

== There's a Fine Fine Line ==
There's a Fine Fine Line

Studio album by Julie Atherton
- Released: 6 June 2010
- Recorded: 2010
- Genre: Musical Theatre
- Label: Greater London Records
- Producer: Cameron Mackentosh

Julie Atherton chronology
No Space for Air	There's a Fine Fine Line	"Rush of Life"

In June 2010, Atherton released the song "There's a Fine, Fine Line" from Avenue Q as a single. The single was a thank-you to her fans from that show.

Track Listing

- "There's a Fine Fine Line"
- Digital Booklet

== Rush of Life ==
In November 2014, Atherton released her most personal studio album to date, Rush of Life, featuring songs written for her by Dougal Irvine, Craig Adams, Lance Horne, George Maguire and Benedict.

Rush of Life

Studio album by Julie Atherton
- Released: 16 November 2014
- Recorded: 2014
- Genre: Pop/Rock
- Label: Theatre Bench Records
- Producer: Jim Zalles

Julie Atherton chronology
There's a Fine Fine Line	Rush of Life

Track Listing

- "Trail of Behaviour" (featuring John Dagleish)
- "I Can't Make You Love Me"
- "Planet Me"
- "My Own"
- "Rush of Life"
- "Somebody New"
- "Your Body" (featuring George Maguire)
- "Say Something"
- "Whoever You Are" (Hidden Track) written by Julie Atherton
