= Sasha Regan =

English theatre director (active 1998– )

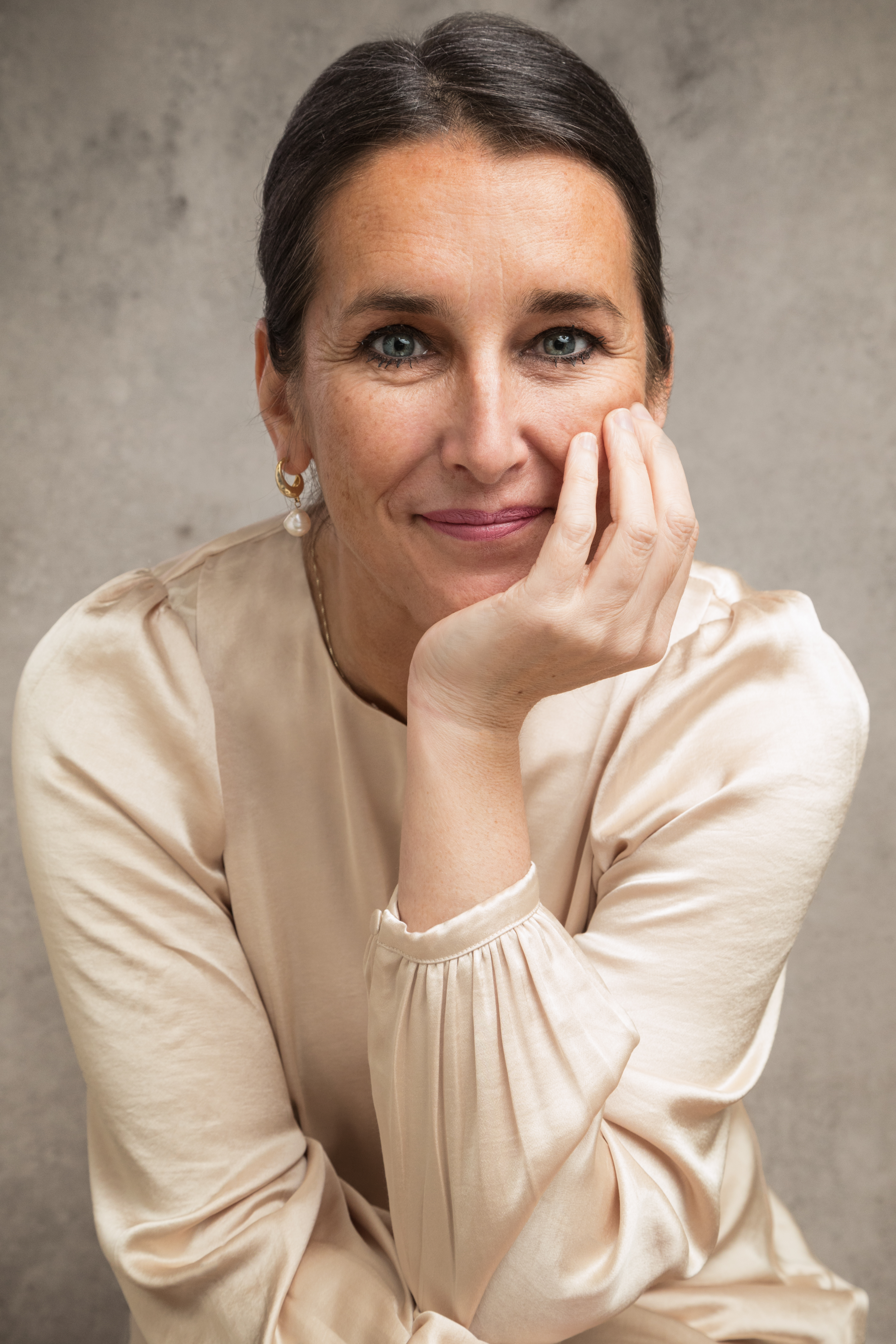
Sasha Regan, October 2020.

Sasha Regan (née Leask) is an English theatre director. In 1998, she founded the Union Theatre, London, a small fringe venue on the premises of a disused paper warehouse on Union Street in the London borough of Southwark. As of November 2020, she was still in charge of the theatre. Her theatre credits include Sweeney Todd, The Pajama Game, Annie Get Your Gun and H.M.S. Pinafore.

In 2007, Regan was awarded the Stage One Bursary for New Producers by the Society of London Theatre. More success followed when the Union took home the Up-and-Coming Theatre Award at the 2008 Empty Space Peter Brook Awards.

Regan is a mother of two.
