= Union Theatre, London =

Theatre in Southwark, London, England

Coordinates: 51.5037°N 0.1019°W

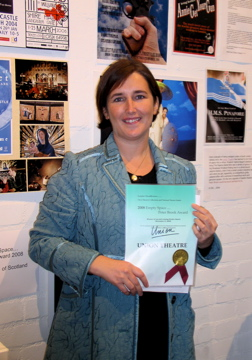
Sasha Regan and the Peter Brook Empty Space Award, at the Union Theatre

The Union Theatre is a fringe theatre situated in the borough of Southwark in London, England. It was established in 1998 by Sasha Regan, and has a reputation for staging musicals.

== Original premises ==
In 1998, Sasha Regan took the initiative to convert a disused paper warehouse on Union Street near Southwark station into a functioning theatre. Set beneath railway arches, it was one of the more distinctive theatrical spaces in London. When its landlord, the publicly owned infrastructure body Network Rail, wished to redevelop the site for offices, a campaign was started to save the theatre, and also other small businesses nearby which were given just 12 weeks notice to relocate. The Union Theatre was given a stay of execution.

== Relocation ==
In 2016, after almost twenty years in its original premises, the Union Theatre moved into new Network Rail premises just across the road from its original site. The theatre's new home, which "will keep the heart of the Union intact," offers a restaurant, rehearsal room, and some offices to let. Enhanced facilities include tiered seats and an increased seating capacity.

== Notable productions ==
- HMS Pinafore (2007).
- Sweeney Todd (2008) by Stephen Sondheim
- Assassins (2008) by Stephen Sondheim
- The Pajama Game (2008) by Adler and Ross
- The Mikado (2008) by Gilbert and Sullivan (an all-male version)
- 'A Man of No Importance' (2009) by Stephen Flaherty and Lynn Ahrens with book by Terrence McNally transferred to the West End playing at The Arts Theatre Leicester Square
- Once Upon a Time at the Adelphi (2010), London premier of a new musical
