= Larry Ruttman =

American attorney, author, and historian (born 1931)

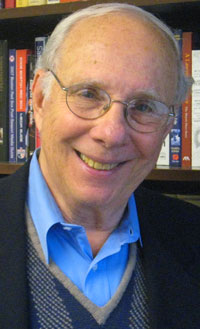
- Ruttman in his Brookline, Massachusetts office in 2012
- Born: Lawrence Allen Ruttman; February 8, 1931 (age 95); Boston, Massachusetts, U.S.
- Education: University of Massachusetts, Amherst (BA); Boston College Law School (JD)
- Occupations: Attorney, author, and historian
- Spouse: Lois Raverby (m. 1963)
- Writing career
- Notable works: Voices of Brookline (2005); American Jews and America's Game (2013); My Eighty-Two Year Love Affair with Fenway Park (2018); Larry Ruttman: A Life Lived Backwards: An Existential Triad of Friendship, Maturation, and Inquisitiveness (2021); Intimate Conversations: Face to Face with Matchless Musicians (2022, 2024)
- Website: larryruttman.com

Lawrence Allen Ruttman (born February 8, 1931) is an American attorney, author, and historian. He is best known for his five books: Voices of Brookline; American Jews and America's Game; his baseball memoir, My Eighty-Two Year Love Affair with Fenway Park: From Teddy Ballgame to Mookie Betts; his memoir, Larry Ruttman: A Life Lived Backwards: An Existential Triad of Friendship, Maturation, and Inquisitiveness; and Intimate Conversations: Face to Face With Matchless Musicians, scheduled for publication on October 1, 2024.

== Biography ==
Ruttman was born in Boston, Massachusetts to Doris Grandberg Ruttman and Morris "Moe" Ruttman and moved to Brookline, Massachusetts at the age of two. He graduated from Brookline High School, received a Bachelor of Arts in English from the University of Massachusetts Amherst, and earned a Juris Doctor from Boston College Law School in 1958. From 1952 to 1954, he served in the United States Air Force during the Korean War, and was honorably discharged as a First Lieutenant. He married Lois Raverby on November 3, 1963.

He has practiced law in Brookline since 1960. He was an Assistant Attorney General in the civil rights section of the Massachusetts Office of the Attorney General from 1960 to 1962. He is a fellow of the Massachusetts Bar Foundation, the charitable partner of the Massachusetts Bar Association, and served on the Board of Governors of the Massachusetts Academy of Trial Attorneys (MATA) in the 1980s. He was an elected Brookline Town Meeting member from 1958 to 1968, an elected Democratic Town Committee member from 1960 to 1976, and an appointed member of the Brookline Cable Trust from 1984 to 1986.

In 2019, Ruttman led an effort at the Brookline Town Meeting to rename the former Edward Devotion School in honor of Ethel Weiss, the owner of a nearby toy and card shop, who welcomed neighborhood children into her store for more than 76 years.

On June 14, 2013, Ruttman was elected as a Fellow of the Massachusetts Historical Society, which was founded in 1791.

Ruttman's papers on his first two books, Voices of Brookline and American Jews and America's Game, have been collected by the Wyner Family Jewish Heritage Center (JHC), formerly of the American Jewish Historical Society, and now in collaboration with and at the New England Historic Genealogical Society in Boston, Massachusetts, and collated, digitized, formatted, indexed, and published worldwide online. A finding aid for the collection was published in 2018.

== Writing career ==
Ruttman's career as a published writer began at age 67, when he accompanied the members of a Plymouth, Massachusetts rowing club to the World Pilot Gig Championships on the Isles of Scilly in the United Kingdom. His article about the event, "Row Hard No Excuses," was published as the cover story of the boating magazine Messing About in Boats. The next year, his article about the team's trip to the Dutch Open Gig Championships again made the magazine's cover.

=== Oral History of American Music ===
In the early 2000s, Ruttman was chosen as an interviewer by founder and then-director Vivian Perlis of Yale University's Oral History of American Music, which has preserved "audio and visual memoirs in the voices of the major musical figures of our time" since the 1960s. In that capacity, Ruttman interviewed the American microtonalist composer Ezra Sims as well as Guggenheim and MacArthur-winning composer and pianist Ran Blake.

=== Voices of Brookline ===
Ruttman self-published Voices of Brookline through Peter E. Randall Publisher LLC in 2005; Michael Dukakis, former governor of Massachusetts and 1988 presidential candidate, wrote the foreword. The book features Ruttman's biographies of 75 Brookline citizens. In addition to Dukakis, television journalist Mike Wallace, and Boston Symphony Orchestra conductor Harry Ellis Dickson, the book's subjects include journalist Ellen Goodman; architecture critic and author Jane Holtz Kay; Nobel Prize-winning physicist Wolfgang Ketterle; New England Patriots owner Robert Kraft; composer Osvaldo Golijov; pianist and composer Ran Blake; many ordinary citizens involved in town government, education, preservation, and other pursuits; and two notable sports venues, the Longwood Cricket Club (site of the first Davis Cup) and The Country Club (which hosted the 1999 Ryder Cup and the 2022 U.S. Open Championship).

Boston University professor and historian Howard Zinn wrote of Voices of Brookline, "[This] book is a model of how an oral history of a town ought to be written."

=== American Jews and America's Game ===
Ruttman drew on his lifelong love of baseball for his next book, American Jews and America's Game: Voices of a Growing Legacy in Baseball, published in 2013 by the University of Nebraska Press. "Growing up in Brookline in the late 1930s and early 1940s, Larry Ruttman used to play stickball behind the Devotion School. Now, at 82 years old, Ruttman is making the jump to the major leagues," wrote The Boston Globe. American Jews and America's Game includes short biographies of more than 40 Jewish men and women in baseball, including players (from Hank Greenberg, Sandy Koufax, and Thelma 'Tiby' Eisen of the All-American Girls Professional Baseball League to Kevin Youkilis and Ian Kinsler), league officials and team owners (Major League Baseball commissioner Bud Selig, who also wrote the book's foreword; Theo Epstein, the youngest general manager in baseball history), to journalists and fans (Pulitzer-prize nominated reporter Alan Schwarz, Harvard Law School professor Alan Dershowitz, former U.S. representative Barney Frank). Ruttman began the book in Israel in 2007 while interviewing managers of the new Israel Baseball League, including former Major League players Ken Holtzman, Ron Blomberg, Art Shamsky, and Steve Hertz, as well as former Yankees public relations director and author Marty Appel. He traveled across the U.S. to interview subjects for the book over the next four years. The book's subjects share their stories of growing up Jewish and succeeding in America; discuss hot-button issues such as intermarriage, assimilation, future viability, Jewish identity, religious observance, anti-Semitism, and Israel; and bring to life the role of Jewish men and women in America's pastime and America. American Jews and America's Game has been reviewed by Bloomberg Business Week, Kirkus Reviews, and many other baseball, Jewish, and general interest publications.

American Jews and America's Game was selected for the National Library Service for the Blind and Physically Handicapped Talking Book Program.

=== Jews on First ===
Playwrights Larry Jay Tish and Lee Goodwin and composer Erin Murray Quinlan wrote Jews on First, a musical adapted from American Jews and America's Game. The world premiere took place at the American Jewish Historical Society in New York City on April 11, 2016. The play was also staged at the New Surry Theatre in Blue Hill, Maine; Hebrew SeniorLife in Roslindale, Massachusetts; and NewBridge on the Charles in Dedham, Massachusetts. Development of the musical ended after the March 2017 death of philanthropist Ted Cutler.

=== My Eighty-Two Year Love Affair with Fenway Park: From Teddy Ballgame to Mookie Betts ===
In May 2018, Ruttman published a memoir of his years as a fan of the Boston Red Sox, My Eighty-Two Year Love Affair with Fenway Park: From Teddy Ballgame to Mookie Betts. Longtime sportswriter and Red Sox team historian Gordon Edes described it as "an unmatched, and highly personal, view of what it meant to have a front-row seat on Fenway Park history." The Boston Globe published an excerpt from the memoir on December 24, 2018. The complete memoir was also published in NINE: A Journal of Baseball History and Culture.

=== Larry Ruttman: A Life Lived Backwards: An Existential Triad of Friendship, Maturation, and Inquisitiveness ===
In 2021, Ruttman self-published Larry Ruttman: A Life Lived Backwards: An Existential Triad of Friendship, Maturation, and Inquisitiveness through Harvard Book Store. Written largely during the pandemic, the book covers Ruttman's early life, legal practice, friendships, and second career as an interviewer, author, and storyteller.

=== Intimate Conversations: Face to Face with Matchless Musicians ===
In 2022, Ruttman's fifth book, Intimate Conversations: Face to Face with Matchless Musicians, was self-published through Harvard Book Store. The book features Ruttman's interviews with twenty-one notable composers, conductors, instrumentalists, and other musicians. Kirkus Reviews said of the book, "An avid classical music fan talks with some of his favorite composers, conductors, and musicians in this collection of interviews.... [Ruttman] has assembled an impressive list of interviewees in the classical music world, separating them into such sections as composers (John Harbison, Unsuk Chin, Osvaldo Golijov), conductors (Gil Rose, Martin Pearlman), instrumentalists and vocalists (Anne-Sophie Mutter, Susan Graham, Aiko Onishi), music management (Mark Volpe), and the 'beyond genre' (Ran Blake, Eden MacAdam-Somer, Monica Rizzio)…..He examines his subjects’ personal histories and their philosophies, musical and otherwise, and comes up with good questions, as when he asks Harbison if he can compose while working as a conductor. And he gets some thought-provoking answers….. Despite a few flaws, this volume offers plenty of compelling tidbits for classical music aficionados."

Torchflame Books published a revised edition of Intimate Conversations in 2024.

Matthew Sutherland, executive editor of Foreword Reviews, extensively interviewed Ruttman about Intimate Conversations, which drew from the author comprehensive remarks on the book, its underlying purpose, his passionate feelings about music and life, and the relationship of one to the other.

=== Baseball and the American Dream ===
On July 19, 2021, Ruttman’s video conversation with Eddie Romero Jr, Vice President and Assistant General Manager of the Boston Red Sox, was presented by Brookline Rotary, Brookline Interactive Group Television, and BrooklineHub.com as part of a one-hour program entitled Baseball and The American Dream. In the program, “historian Larry Ruttman of Brookline, Eddie Romero Jr of the Boston Red Sox general management, and Jordan Rich of WBZ Radio share their personal reminiscences about living in America with baseball as a backdrop – a retrospective spanning almost ninety years. They look at the changes in baseball as it has evolved to be more inclusive and to care about the quality of the players’ lives, not just their batting averages."

=== A Life Lived Backwards: One Man's Life podcast ===
In August 2021, Ruttman began a biweekly podcast, A Life Lived Backwards: One Man's Life, based on his memoir of a similar name. In each episode, Boston radio host Jordan Rich interviews Ruttman about the people, places and experiences that have shaped him and contributed to his life adventure. "I’m hoping my life, and my use of my particular characteristics of Friendship, Inquisitiveness, and Maturation, may help you find yours at any time of life," Ruttman said in his note to the first episode. Episodes #56, #57, and #58 in that series discuss Ruttman's fifth book, Intimate Conversations: Face to Face with Matchless Musicians.

=== Approach to historical writing ===
Although Ruttman's work is often referred to as "oral history," Ruttman uses the term "biographical cultural history." "Oral history is generally presented dryly as only the verbatim answers of the interviewee to an invisible interviewer," he wrote in a July 2015 blog post. "Or, if visible, the interviewer is represented only by his question. In my books, I seek to transform the interview into a short biography related as a lively conversation between the subject and me. Thus, I'm not only visible, but shifting here and there, as required by the arc of the short biography I am writing, to the third person to interject comments or information to fill in the gaps, and thus project the interview not only as a lively conversation, but as the story, in essence, of a person's life."

=== Contributions to scholarly archives ===
In 2015, Ruttman donated interview recordings, interview transcripts, and illustrations from American Jews and America's Game to seven libraries and archives, including the Library of Congress and the National Baseball Hall of Fame and Museum.

== Awards ==
Intimate Conversations: Face to Face with Matchless Musicians won an Honorable Mention in the Performing Arts & Music category of the 2024 Foreword Indie Awards, and was a 2024 Finalist for the Nellie Bly Award for Journalistic Non-Fiction from the Chanticleer International Book Awards.

American Jews and America's Game was named the #1 Baseball Book of 2013 by Sports Collectors Digest. It was also a finalist in the Sports category for the 2013 Foreword Reviews INDIEFAB Book of the Year Award.

Voices of Brookline was a finalist for the 2005 American Association for State and Local History Award of Merit.
