= Speckulation Entertainment =

Speckulation Entertainment is a British record label dedicated to musical theatre. It was founded by Neil Eckersley, who had originally released cast recordings of A Spoonful of Stiles & Drewe, Stiles & Drewe's Peter Pan, Christmas in New York and Dougal Irvine's Departure Lounge.

Solo releases by West End artists include Julie Atherton: No Space for Air and Helena Blackman: The Sound of Rodgers & Hammerstein. Speckulation's recent album, Michael Bruce: Unwritten Songs, was promoted with the YouTube personality Portrait of a Princess and has received over a half million views to date. Speckulation's latest album is a live recording of Momentous Musicals which starred Gareth Gates. The original cast recording of Been on Broadway is expected for release in 2015.
