= Once Upon a Time at the Adelphi =

2008 musical by Phil Willmott and Elliot Davis

Once Upon a Time at the Adelphi is a musical written by Phil Willmott and Elliot Davis. It received its world premiere at the Liverpool Playhouse, England from June to August 2008. The production starred Julie Atherton and Simon Bailey, was directed by Phil Willmott with musical direction and arrangements by Elliot Davis, choreography by Andrew Wright, associate musical direction and additional arrangements by Mark Collins, set and costume design by Christopher Woods and sound design by Jason Barnes.

It was written and produced for the Liverpool '08 Capital of Culture celebrations and featured a professional cast of principals and an ensemble from the Liverpool Institute for Performing Arts.

== Narrative ==
Once Upon a Time at the Adelphi follows two stories; in the present day, Jo works at the world-famous Adelphi Hotel in Liverpool. On a busy day of hen parties and difficult customers, Jo is informed by her colleague and boyfriend, Neil, that somebody is on the hotel's roof. Upon finding the female stranger, she tells Jo she wants to meet her ex-lover, Thompson - and reveals an epic story of the Adelphi Hotel's history, when Hollywood actors stayed there en route to UK and European destinations. Many of the stories are based on actual events, for example, Roy Rogers riding his horse Trigger in the hotel. The show portrays this event on the roof, whereas in real life Rogers reportedly waved at the crowd from the balcony.

Back in the present, Jo is having trouble when Neil asks her to leave Liverpool and move to Japan with him, but she is more interested in hearing the strange woman's stories. It transpires that she also worked at the hotel in the past, where she fell in love with a young vagabond called Thompson, whom she helped obtain employment at the hotel in order to get his life in order. However, during a misunderstanding over a stolen ring, Thompson left the hotel and joined the Resistance and fought in the Second World War. Years later, whilst Liverpool was under heavy bombardment, Thompson promised to return so they could dance on the roof of the hotel.

In the present day, Neil tries to research the stranger's story so that Jo can return to her work and, hopefully, leave Liverpool with him that night. Finally, the stranger reveals how a dance for American soldiers in the Adelphi ballroom was interrupted by a destructive air-raid, and she tried to reach the roof to meet with Thompson. Neil interrupts the story and tells Jo that he has discovered that the stranger had died in that air-raid. Jo realises life is too short to deny love, and agrees to leave with Neil. As they embrace, Thompson arrives, and in the rain, the reunited couple finally dance on the roof, joined by the spirits of the show's characters.

== Awards Productions ==
Once Upon a Time at the Adelphi won the 2008 TMA Award for Best Musical Production and was nominated for Best Regional Production at the 2009 WhatsOnStage Awards. A section of the show was performed at the awards ceremony at the Prince of Wales Theatre on Sunday 15 February 2009. The section starred Julie Atherton as Young Alice and Tom Oakley as Thompson, supported by an ensemble of final year students from Arts Ed school in London. It was choreographed by Andrew Wright and conducted by Mark Collins.

The show also received a West End showcase at the Trafalgar Studios in November 2008 conducted by Elliot Davis. The show received a full staging in London's Union Theatre in March 2010.

The musical was given its amateur premiere on Merseyside at the Floral Pavilion, New Brighton in May 2010 by West Kirby Light Opera Society ( WKLOS ), who worked with the writer to turn it into a full scale singing and dancing musical, with orchestra. The show is returning to the Floral Pavilion New Brighton in June 2018, marking the 10th anniversary of Liverpool's Capital of Culture Year.

== Musical Numbers ==
Act I

- "Somebody on the Roof" - Jo, Neil and Company
- "Thompson" - Alice and Company
- "Once in a Lifetime" - Lord Rothmore, Young Alice, Thompson and Company
- "First Romances" - Thompson's Mum
- "Show Tune" - Thompson and Company
- "Rats" - Thompson and Company
- "A Wedding and a Yacht" - Babs, Maids, Movie Stars and Reporters
- "Yippee Ai Eh!" - Roy Rogers and Babs
- "Tell Her" - Thompson, Babs, Young Alice, Fritz
- "Once in a Lifetime (Reprise)" -Thompson, Babs, Young Alice, Fritz, Roy

Act II

- "Thompson from Accounts" - Young Alice, Alice, Thompson and Company
- "Tell Them" - Babs and Thompson
- "Dance for me Boy" - Delores Gilmore
- "The Next Ten Seconds" - Young Alice
- "Somehow" - Neil
- "Take a Moment" - Older Thompson
- "Just Fine" - Young Alice, Alice and Company
- "Dance for Me/Boogey Woogey Dance Routine" - Company
- "Tell Him" - Alice and Thompson
- "Finale" - Company
