= Notes from New York =

Notes From New York is a successful London (West End) based concert series, created primarily to showcase the output of contemporary musical theatre writers.

== Creators and Collaborators ==
Founded in 2003 by producer Neil Eckersley and actor/musician David Randall (who became the series regular director and arranger), the concerts have usually been headlined by the primary collaborators Paul Spicer and Julie Atherton who also fulfil creative roles in musical staging.

Other frequent collaborators include regular actors (such as Oliver Thompsett & Ashleigh Gray), sound designer Mark Dunne, pianists Mark Collins and Joe Hood.

== Concert history ==
2 November 2003 – Arts Theatre, Leicester Square Starring Julie Atherton, Paul Spicer, Shona Lindsey and Damien Edwards. Featuring music by Jason Robert Brown and Andrew Lippa.

7 March 2004 – Donmar Warehouse, Covent Garden Starring Julie Atherton, Paul Spicer, Debbie Kurup and Craig Purnell. Featuring music by Jason Robert Brown, Jonathan Larson and William Finn.

4 July 2004 – Arts Theatre, Leicester Square Starring Julie Atherton, Paul Spicer, Kellie Ryan and Samuel Barnett. Featuring music by Andrew Lippa, Craig Carnelia and Jimmy Roberts.

19 September 2004 – Trafalgar Studios, Whitehall Starring Rebecca Thornhill, Stephen Weller, Oliver Tompsett and Ashleigh Gray. Featuring music by Adam Guettel, Michael John LaChuisa and John Buccino.

21 November 2004 – Trafalgar Studios, Whitehall Starring Julie Atherton, Paul Spicer, Amy Nuttall, Jon Lee, Shona Lindsay, Damien Edwards, Oliver Tompsett and Ashleigh Gray. Featuring music from all composers in the series so far and Tim Acito.

9 December 2013 - Palace Theatre, Shaftesbury Avenue Starring Eden Espinosa, Scott Garnham, Andy Coxon, Zoe Rainey, Julie Atherton, Tori Allen-Martin, Lucy May Barker, Luke Kempner, Ambra Caserotti, Sarah Goggin, Nathan Lodge and Sebastian Thomas.

== Not(es) From New York ==
Notes From New York presented an evening of new British musical theatre on 19 March 2006 at the Duchess Theatre, Covent Garden. Starring Julie Atherton, Paul Spicer, Anna-Jane Casey and Dougal Irvine, the evening showcased the output of composers Grant Olding and Charles Miller.

== Other productions ==
The success of the concerts meant that Notes From New York could create successful evenings on various other themes:

Notes in Heels (6 April 2008 – Duchess Theatre, Covent Garden) showcased female writers Georgia Stitt, Jenny Giering, Zina Goldrich. Again it starred Julie Atherton and Paul Spicer, with newcomers Selina Chilton, Stuart Matthew Price and Amy Pemberton.

The Last Five Years (12, 19 & 26 October 2008 – Theatre Royal, Haymarket) A gala staging of the Jason Robert Brown musical to celebrate five successful years of Notes From New York. Starring the series regulars Julie Atherton and Paul Spicer.

Producer Neil Eckersley and creative Paul Spicer have also formed Speckulation Entertainment, which produced 'A Spoonful of Stiles And Drewe' (6 July 2008 – Her Majesty's Theatre, Haymarket), a celebration of British musical theatre writers George Stiles and Anthony Drewe. The concert has since been released on CD.

== Christmas in New York ==
The seasonal musical celebration has been going since 2006:

Sunday 10 December 2006 – Apollo Theatre, Shaftesbury Avenue, Starring Josie Walker, Julie Atherton, Paul Spicer, Cassidy Janson, James Gillan, Oliver Tompsett, Jon Robyns, Clare Foster, Melanie La Barrie, Daniel Boys, Sophia Ragavelas and Emma Williams.

Sunday 9 December 2007 – Lyric Theatre, Shaftesbury Avenue Starring Anna-Jane Casey, Julie Atherton, Paul Spicer, Oliver Tompsett, Emma Williams, Melanie La Barrie, Matt Cross, Ashleigh Gray, Alex Jessop, Debbie Kurup, Steven Webb and Rachael Wooding.

Sunday 7 December 2008 – Lyric Theatre, Shaftesbury Avenue Starring Maria Friedman, Julie Atherton, Oliver Tompsett, Ashleigh Gray, Michael Xavier, Adrian Hansel, Zoe Rainey, Richard Reynard and Lorna Want.

Sunday 6 December 2009-Princes of Wales Theatre Starring Julie Atherton, Samuel Barnett, Daniel Boys, Ashleigh Gray, Jenna Lee James, Alex Jessop, Leanne Jones, Paul Spicer, Oliver Tompsett, Hannah Waddingham and Rachael Wooding.

== Taking Notes ==
In the summer of 2009, a week-long course, designed for up and coming Contemporary Musical Theatre enthusiasts, was held at The London School of Musical Theatre. The week consisted of day long sessions, workshopping various Musical Numbers including Die Vampire Die (Title of Show), Come to Your Senses (Tick, Tick... Boom!), Nothing in Common (Wearing Someone Else's Clothes: Jason Robert Brown), You Shall Go to the Ball (SOHO Cinders) and two pieces devised by Taking Notes' resident MD new British Musical Theatre composer Michael Bruce, entitled A Little Less Ordinary and Looking Back (Ed: The Musical). The Original Taking Notes Cast comprising 45 students from various areas of the UK, who worked with a number of currently established and successful Musical Theatre artists including Julie Atherton (Avenue Q), Oliver Tompsett (Wicked), Clare Foster (The Bill, Avenue Q), Sam Buntrock (Sunday in the Park with George) Keiran Hill (RSC) and Paul Spicer (The Last 5 Years). The week-long course worked towards a showcase at the end of the week to a privately invited audience. An Original Cast Recording of the Taking Notes Showcase unofficially nicknamed 'Post-It Notes from New York' is available.
