= NHS the Musical =

Musical

NHS The Musical premiered in May 2006 at The Drum Theatre, Theatre Royal, Plymouth. It began in 2002 and took years of research, eventually opening in 2006. It was written by Jimmy Jewell and Nick Stimson, both of whom are associate directors for the Theatre Royal, Plymouth.

== Notable cast ==
- Ashleigh Gray, played a variety of roles.
