= Michael Bruce (composer) =

Scottish composer and lyricist (born 1983)

- Born: 22 November 1983 (age 41); Scotland
- Genres: Theatre music; television score; film score
- Occupations: Composer; lyricist
- Instrument: Piano
- Years active: 2005–present
- Website: michaelbrucecomposer.com

Michael Bruce (born 22 November 1983) is a Scottish composer and lyricist working in theatre, television and film. He was composer-in-residence at the Donmar Warehouse theatre during Josie Rourke's artistic directorship there from 2012 to 2019.

His theatre credits include Much Ado About Nothing (2011) with David Tennant and Catherine Tate, Coriolanus (2013) with Tom Hiddleston, Twelfth Night (2017) with Tamsin Greig and Antony & Cleopatra (2018) with Ralph Fiennes, as well as the 2021 made-for-TV Romeo & Juliet with Josh O'Connor and Jessie Buckley. In 2022, he wrote original songs for the Netflix mockumentary Hard Cell.

== Early life and education ==
Bruce grew up in Aberdeen, Scotland and first took to the stage in Scottish Ballet's production of The Nutcracker, going on to become Highland Dancing Champion. Done with dancing, he took up table tennis in his teens, playing for the Scotland national team throughout Europe. He then studied as a singer/songwriter at Paul McCartney's Liverpool Institute for Performing Arts.

== Career ==
Early in his career, he worked as a musical director at the Battersea Arts Centre, the Theatre Royal Lincoln and the Edinburgh Festival Fringe, and also assisted on several national tours, cruise ships and pantomimes. In 2007, he won the Notes for The Stage competition run by the Notes from New York concert series and The Stage newspaper, which led to a concert of his musical theatre work being staged at the Apollo Theatre on Shaftesbury Avenue.

He soon got his break as the first composer-in-residence at the Bush Theatre, when its artistic director was Josie Rourke. From 2012 to 2019, he held the same position at the Donmar Warehouse, after Rourke was appointed there as Michael Grandage's successor. He wrote scores for many plays at the Donmar, including Coriolanus (2013) with Tom Hiddleston, Les Liaisons Dangereuses (2016) with Dominic West and Janet McTeer and Saint Joan (2016) with Gemma Arterton, all three shown in cinemas across the UK and internationally as part of the National Theatre Live programme, as well as BAFTA-nominated The Vote (2015) with Judi Dench, broadcast live on More4 on general election night.

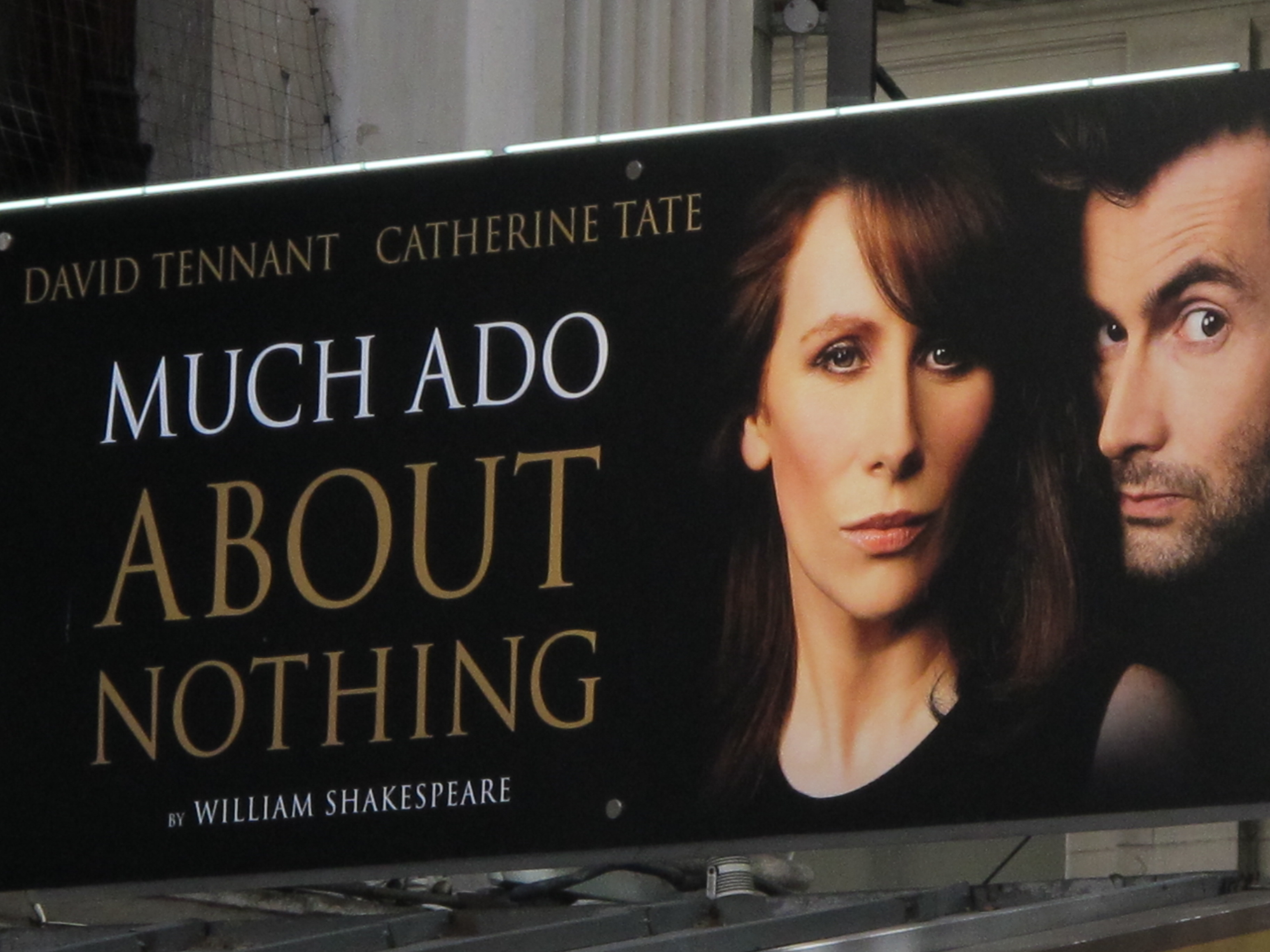
Poster for the 2011 production of Much Ado About Nothing with David Tennant and Catherine Tate, who sang Bruce's original song "We Go Together" on the official soundtrack, available on music streaming services

His other theatre credits include Sonia Friedman's Much Ado About Nothing (2011) with David Tennant and Catherine Tate at the Wyndham's Theatre, Candide (2013), The Two Gentlemen of Verona (2014) and Timon of Athens (2018) for the Royal Shakespeare Company, Noises Off (2012) and Other Desert Cities (2014) at the Old Vic, Privacy (2016) at the Public Theater in New York and The Winslow Boy (2013) on Broadway.

Bruce has also worked on many productions at the National Theatre, including Man and Superman (2015) and Antony & Cleopatra (2018), both starring Ralph Fiennes, The Beaux' Stratagem (2015) with Samuel Barnett, Twelfth Night (2017) with Tamsin Greig and Hansard (2019) with Lindsay Duncan, all of which became parts of the National Theatre Live collection.

In 2011, he released his debut musical theatre album, Unwritten Songs, which entered the iTunes vocal chart at No. 1. He has also written a book called Writing Music for the Stage: A Practical Guide for Theatremakers, which was published by Nick Hern Books in 2016 with a foreword by Josie Rourke. Mark Gatiss called it "a must-read for all those with an interest in how music works on stage", while Judi Dench commented, "A good score makes a world of difference to an actor. Read Michael Bruce's book and you'll understand why. He is a genius."

During the COVID-19 pandemic, he wrote the soundtrack for the National Theatre's critically acclaimed first made-solely-for-TV production of Romeo & Juliet (2021), filmed in 17 days in an empty theatre with Josh O'Connor, Jessie Buckley and Tamsin Greig. It premiered on Sky Arts in the UK and PBS in the USA. He also recently wrote original songs for the Netflix mockumentary sitcom Hard Cell (2022) and the original score for The Nan Movie (2022), both starring and written by Catherine Tate.

== Composing credits ==
=== Film and television ===
Year	Title	Notes
2013	10 O'Clock Live	Episode #3.1
2021	Romeo & Juliet	National Theatre's first made-for-TV production starring Josh O'Connor and Jessie Buckley
2022	The Nan Movie	
2022	Hard Cell	6 episodes; original songs
2022	Great Performances	Episode: "Keeping Company with Sondheim"
2023	A Merry Scottish Christmas	Hallmark Channel original films
2024	A Scottish Love Scheme	Hallmark Channel original films

=== Theatre productions ===
Year	Title	Venue
2009	Ed: The Musical	Edinburgh Festival Fringe / Trafalgar Theatre
2010	The Great British Country Fete	Bush Theatre
2010–2011	Men Should Weep	National Theatre
2011	Much Ado About Nothing	Wyndham's Theatre
2012	Noises Off	Old Vic Theatre / Novello Theatre
2012	The Recruiting Officer	Donmar Warehouse
2012	Blue Heart Afternoon	Hampstead Theatre
2012	The Physicists	Donmar Warehouse
2012	Events While Guarding The Bofors Gun	Finborough Theatre
2012	Philadelphia, Here I Come!	Donmar Warehouse
2012	Relatively Speaking	Theatre Royal Bath
2012	Berenice	Donmar Warehouse
2012	Straight	Crucible Theatre / Bush Theatre
2013	Trelawny of the Wells	Donmar Warehouse
2013	Noises Off	UK tour
2013	Relatively Speaking	Wyndham's Theatre
2013	Strange Interlude	National Theatre
2013	A Little Hotel on the Side	Theatre Royal Bath
2013	Candide	Royal Shakespeare Company
2013	The Machine	Manchester International Festival / Park Avenue Armory
2013	The Winslow Boy	Old Vic Theatre / Roundabout Theatre Company
2013	Coriolanus	Donmar Warehouse
2014	Other Desert Cities	Old Vic Theatre
2014	Privacy	Donmar Warehouse
2014	The Two Gentlemen of Verona	Royal Shakespeare Company
2014	Hay Fever	Theatre Royal Bath
2015	Hay Fever	Duke of York's Theatre / Theatre Royal Windsor / Manor Pavilion Theatre
2015	Man and Superman	National Theatre
2015	The Vote	Donmar Warehouse
2015	The Beaux' Stratagem	National Theatre
2015	Tipping the Velvet	Lyric Theatre
2016	Sunset at the Villa Thalia	National Theatre
2016	Privacy	The Public Theater
2016	Les Liaisons Dangereuses	Donmar Warehouse / Booth Theatre
2016	Saint Joan	Donmar Warehouse
2017	Twelfth Night	National Theatre
2017	The Lady from the Sea	Donmar Warehouse
2018	Harold and Maude	Charing Cross Theatre
2018	The Importance of Being Earnest	Vaudeville Theatre
2018	Antony & Cleopatra	National Theatre
2018	Measure for Measure	Donmar Warehouse
2018	Timon of Athens	Royal Shakespeare Company
2019	Hansard	National Theatre
2020	Timon of Athens	Theatre for a New Audience / Shakespeare Theatre Company
2021	The Illusionist	Umeda Arts Theater
2022	Much Ado About Nothing	National Theatre

== Accolades ==
=== Awards ===
- 2007: Notes for The Stage competition run by Notes from New York and The Stage
- 2009: MTM Awards – Most Promising New Musical for Ed: The Musical

=== Nominations ===
- 2009: MTM Awards – Best Lyrics for a New Musical for Ed: The Musical
- 2009: MTM Awards – Best Music for a New Musical for Ed: The Musical
- 2013: WhatsOnStage Awards – Best Original Music for The Recruiting Officer
- 2021: Online Film & Television Association TV Awards – Best Music Composition in A Motion Picture, Limited, or Anthology for Romeo & Juliet

== Publications ==
- Writing Music for the Stage: A Practical Guide for Theatremakers (2016), with a foreword by Josie Rourke: ISBN 9781848423930
- "Why every composer gains by writing music for plays", an article published in The Stage on 23 June 2016
- "How I wrote the music for Privacy", an article published on WhatsOnStage.com on 19 July 2016
