= Manchester Animation Festival =

- Location: Manchester, England
- Founded: 2015; 11 years ago
- Language: English
- Website: www.manchesteranimationfestival.co.uk

Manchester Animation Festival is an annual animation festival based in Manchester, England. It takes place in November and describes itself as "the UK’s largest Animation Festival".

The event is hosted at HOME, Manchester’s centre for international contemporary art, theatre, film and books, which opened in May 2015. HOME was designed by Dutch architects Mecanoo, and includes two theatres, a gallery space; five screens; broadcast facilities; and a café bar and restaurant. The festival director is Steve Henderson.

The Festival was born out of the Bradford Animation Festival that was set up by Bill Lawrence in 1994 whilst working at the National Museum of Photography, Film & Television. When the Museum decided not to continue the Festival 2014, Bill Lawrence, Jennifer Hall and Steve Henderson approached HOME to see if they would host. With support from the British Film Institute, the first event was launched 17 November 2015.
