= Edith Wiens =

Canadian opera singer

Edith Wiens OC
- Born: 9 June 1950 (age 76); Saskatoon, Saskatchewan, Canada
- Occupations: Classical soprano; academic
- Years active: 1980–present
- Website: edithwiens.com

Edith Wiens OC (born 9 June 1950) is a Canadian opera, recital and concert singer with a soprano voice.

== Early life and education ==
Wiens, daughter of a Mennonite pastor, grew up in Vancouver where she finished high school at the age of 16. She studied theology and church music at Columbia Bible College in Clearbrook. At age 20 she received a bursary to study singing in Hannover, Germany. She went on to Oberlin Conservatory of Music to study with Richard Miller. She received her Bachelor and Master of Music degrees there.

== Career ==
Her international career started in 1980 when the Berlin Philharmonic engaged her. This collaboration extended to well over 30 concerts with that orchestra. She has worked with well known conductors like Daniel Barenboim, Nikolaus Harnoncourt, Kurt Masur, Seiji Ozawa, Wolfgang Sawallisch, Klaus Tennstedt and Sir Georg Solti.

Wiens had her operatic debut in 1986 at the Glyndebourne Festival as Donna Anna in Mozart's Don Giovanni under Bernard Haitink. She sang further Mozart roles in Amsterdam, Milan, Buenos Aires, in Canada, the US and Japan. Wiens was especially known as a concert singer, singing with major orchestras worldwide, such as New York Philharmonic, Cleveland, Philadelphia and Chicago, London Philharmonic, the Concertgebouw Orchestra Amsterdam, Israel Philharmonic, and many others. As a recitalist, Wiens sang in Wigmore Hall, London, Carnegie Hall, New York, in Moscow's Pushkin Museum and repeatedly in Vienna's Musikverein.

Wiens was a member of the faculty at the Juilliard School in New York City. She also teaches singers of the Lindemann Program at the Metropolitan Opera. She is also a regular guest of the Guildhall School of Music and Drama in London and the Royal College, and is repeatedly engaged to teach the young ensembles at the opera houses of Munich, Frankfurt, Zürich and Oslo. In 2011 the Internationale Meistersinger Akademie was founded, of which she is the artistic director. The alumni of this summer academy, as well as her students from Juilliard, sing in major opera houses such as the Royal Opera House London, Metropolitan Opera New York, Munich, Hamburg, Dresden, Leipzig, Geneva, the Aalto Theatre in Essen, La Scala, Zürich, Vienna, Frankfurt, Stuttgart, etc.

== Awards ==
Wiens won first prize in the Robert Schumann International Competition for Pianists and Singers, second prize at the ARD International Music Competition in Munich, and was a prize winner at the Mozart Competition in Salzburg. She has honorary doctorates from Oberlin College and the University of Regina, as well as from the University of Saskatchewan in Canada. She was invested an Officer of the Order of Canada in 2000. The Bavarian Ministry of Culture awarded her the Pro meritis scientiae et litterarum honor.

== Personal life ==
Wiens was briefly Chair of Voice at the Juilliard School, a position formerly held by former Juilliard School faculty member Edith Bers, the late Sanford Sylvan, and current Juilliard School faculty member Cynthia Hoffmann.

Wiens is married to German cellist Kai Moser. They have two children: cellist Johannes Moser and pianist Benjamin Moser (Musiker).
