= Philip Lasser =

American classical composer (born 1963)

- Born: August 4, 1963 (age 63); New York City
- Education: Ecole d'Arts Americaines; Harvard University; Columbia University; Juilliard School
- Occupations: Composer; music theorist; pianist
- Website: www.philiplasser.com

Philip Lasser (born August 4, 1963) is an American composer of contemporary classical music, music theorist, and pianist. He is a member of the faculty at the Juilliard School in New York City since 1994.

== Life and career ==
Philip Lasser was born in New York City on August 4, 1963, and began taking piano lessons at only the age of five. At age sixteen, he entered the Ecole d'Arts Americaines in the Palace of Fontainebleau, France. He studied at Harvard University and, following receipt of a Bachelor's degree, he lived in Paris from 1985 to 1988.

In 1988 Lasser entered Columbia University for a Master's degree in Composition, then entered Juilliard, receiving a degree in Doctor of Musical Arts. He wrote an academic work on the contrapuntal analysis of music entitled The Spiraling Tapestry, published by Rassel Editions. His piece Twelve Variations on a Chorale by J. S. Bach has been recorded by pianist Simone Dinnerstein on the Telarc record label.

Lasser is president of the European American Musical Alliance. As director of EAMA's Summer Music Programs in Paris since its 1996 inception, he promotes the pedagogical training of young musicians. Notable alumni of this program include musical theatre composer Erin Murray Quinlan.

Lasser became a faculty member of Juilliard in 1994. In 2006 he received the Walter Hinrichsen Award from the American Academy and Institute of Arts and Letters. He previously received the National Orchestral Association's New Music Orchestral Project, and the Louis B. Mayer Award for operatic endeavors. He has been composer-in-residence at the Camargo Foundation in Cassis, France, and at the Yaddo Colony.

== Partial list of compositions ==
Orchestral

- So Says the Wind for string orchestra (2004)
- Manchester Miniature for string orchestra (2001)
- Circle of Dreams (2000)
- Southern Landscapes (1998)
- Prelude and Double Fugue in G Minor (1995)

Concertante

- The Circle and the Child for piano and orchestra (2012)
- Vocalise for violin and string orchestra (2000)
- Ballade for violin and string orchestra (1999)
- 3 Counterpoints on Preludes and Fugues from the Well-Tempered Klavier for violin and orchestra (1998)

Chamber music

- Sonapartita for solo violin (2009)
- Ballade for flute and string quartet (2008)
- Chaconne Variations for violin and piano (2008)
- Childhood Suite for solo guitar (2004)
- Sonata for cello and piano (2003)
- Trio in F♯ for violin, cello and piano (2003)
- Vocalise for violin (or viola, or cello) and quartet (arr.) (2003)
- Manchester Miniature for string quartet (2001)
- Into Evening for trombone and harp (2001)
- La Boite de Bijoux for violin and piano (2000)
- Vocalise for violin and piano (arr.) (1999)
- Berceuse Fantasque for violin and piano (1996)
- Sonata for solo viola (1996)
- String Quartet No.1 (1994)
- Counterpoints to the Well-Tempered Klavier for flute, clarinet, violin, viola, or cello and keyboard

Piano

- Still Life in Toccata Style (2005)
- Twelve Variations on a Chorale by J.S. Bach (2002)
- Sonata "Les Hiboux Blancs" (1996)
- Prelude "From Winter to Spring" (1994)

Vocal

- Nicolette et Aucassin for two sopranos, narrator and piano (2008)
- License of Love for mezzo-soprano and piano (2002)
- Les Couleurs de la Vie for soprano and piano (2000)
- Lonely in Eden for mezzo-soprano and piano (1999)
- Parisian Evening for soprano and piano (1999)
- Les Visage de l’Amour for soprano and piano (1998)

Choral

- The Dream Keeper for mixed chorus and chamber orchestra (2006)
- Sing Christmas! for mixed chorus and piano (2001)
- Kaddish for the Six Million for double mixed chorus, cello and cantor (2000)
- B’chol Dor Vador for mixed chorus and piano (1999)
- Esai Esa, Psalm 121 for baritone and mixed chorus (1987)
