= Simon Lipkin =

British actor (born 1986)

- Lipkin as Fagin in Oliver! (2026)
- Born: 9 January 1986 (age 40)
- Education: ArtsEd, London
- Occupation: Actor
- Years active: 2006–present
- Spouse: Georgina Castle (m. 2025)
- Children: 1
- Relatives: Andrew Castle (father-in-law)

Simon Joshua Lipkin (born 9 January 1986) is an English actor, best known for his work in musical theatre. He has originated roles in several major West End musicals such as Avenue Q and Rock of Ages. His television work includes The Amazing World of Gumball and Doctor Who. He has acted in small roles in film as well as in the starring role in 2018 comedy Nativity Rocks!.

== Early life ==
Lipkin grew up in Gants Hill, East London. He attended Ilford Jewish Primary School, Bancroft's School and the Sylvia Young Theatre School. He graduated in 2005 from the Arts Educational School (ArtsEd) with a degree in musical theatre.

== Career ==
In 2006 Lipkin played Nicky/Trekkie as part of the original London cast of Avenue Q in at the Noël Coward Theatre.

He appeared in the 2010/11 UK tour of Monty Python's Spamalot before playing Lonny in the original London cast of Rock of Ages which opened in 2011.

In 2014 he appeared in I Can't Sing!. He then played the role of Proprietor in the Menier Chocolate Factory production of Assassins.

He appeared as Lead Man in I Love You, You're Perfect, Now Change in 2015, followed by puppeteering the title character in The Lorax at the Old Vic.

In 2016 he played Lou Lubowitz in Miss Atomic Bomb and Bill Sykes in Oliver! before joining the cast of Guys and Dolls at the Savoy Theatre, London, as Nathan Detroit, starring opposite Rebel Wilson as Miss Adelaide.

Lipkin along with comedian and composer Vikki Stone hosted the 2017 WhatsOnStage Awards at the Prince Edward Theatre in London. Later on he was part of the original cast of the new Duncan Sheik musical Whisper House at The Other Palace in London. He played the role of Ratty in The Wind in The Willows at the London Palladium from June to September 2017, before playing Mr Poppy in Nativity! The Musical (having previously appeared in Nativity 3: Dude Where's My Donkey?! as Chief Elf) from October 2017 to January 2018 on a UK tour.

He has also appeared in a small role in Show Dogs with fellow theatre star Oliver Tompsett which was released in Spring 2018.

Also in 2018 Lipkin starred in Deborah Isitt's fourth Nativity film, Nativity Rocks!, alongside Daniel Boys and Craig Revel Horwood.

In 2019 he starred as Professor Phillip Goodman in Ghost Stories at the Lyric Theatre, Hammersmith.

He was cast as Louis Drake in Debbie Isitt's 2022 film Christmas on Mistletoe Farm, along with Scott Garnham, Kathryn Drysdale and Ashley Jensen.

Lipkin starred as Buddy in Elf the Musical at the Dominion Theatre alongside Georgina Castle from November 2022 to January 2023.

He was also in Derren Brown's Unbelievable in London's West End.

In 2024, Lipkin played Fagin in Cameron Mackintosh's revival of Oliver!. A co-production between Delfont Mackintosh and Chichester Festival Theatre, the show played at the venue from 8 July to 7 September before a transfer to London's West End at the Gielgud Theatre from 14 December 2024. For this role, he was nominated for Best Actor in a Musical at the 2025 Laurence Olivier Awards.

== Personal life ==
Lipkin married actress and Elf co-star Georgina Castle in September 2025. The couple have a daughter (born 2026).
