= Melanie La Barrie =

Trinidadian actress and singer (born 1974)

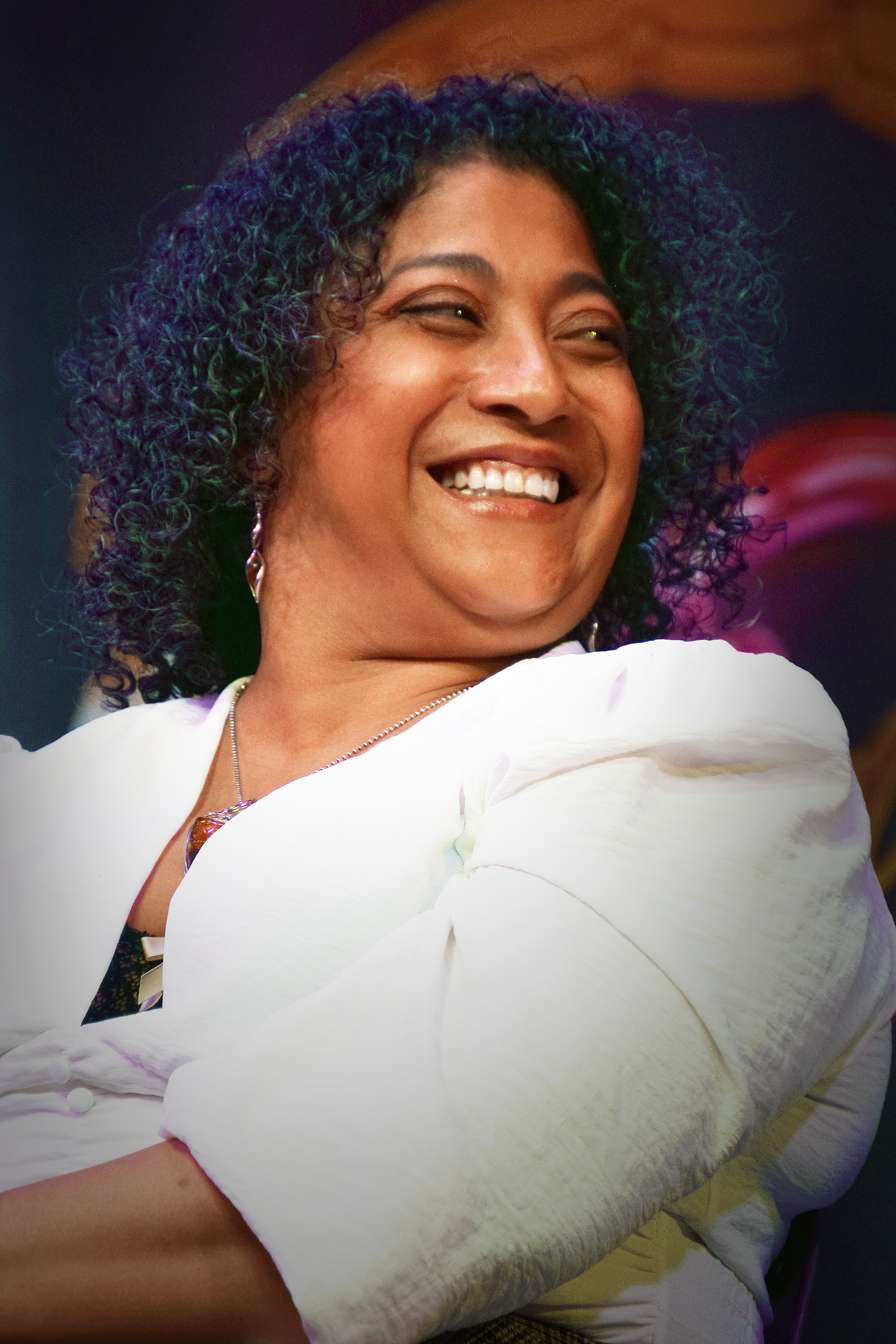
- La Barrie in 2023
- Born: Melanie Hudson; 15 September 1974 (age 52); Trinidad and Tobago
- Occupations: Actress, singer
- Years active: 2003–present

Melanie La Barrie (born 1974) is a Trinidad-born actress and singer, best known for originating the role of Angélique/Nurse in & Juliet in London's West End and on Broadway. Between February 2024 and February 2025, she appeared as Hermes in the Original West End production of Hadestown, which earned her a WhatsOnStage Award for Best Supporting Performer in a Musical.

== Early life ==
Born in Trinidad and Tobago, La Barrie aspired to be an actor from a young age. Encouraged by her school teachers to compete in junior calypso music competitions, by the age of eight she was regularly performing on stage.

In 2000, she and a select group of actors were chosen to perform the Trinidadian play Clear Water in London. While in the UK, she was offered representation and secured her first role in a musical, Ragtime.

== Career ==
=== Musical theatre ===
La Barrie made her West End debut in the ensemble of Ragtime in 2003.

She was cast as Ma Rainey in August Wilson's Ma Rainey's Black Bottom at the Liverpool Playhouse in 2004.

In 2004–2005, she was part of the original cast of the musical Mary Poppins, playing the role of Mrs Corry. The cast included Laura Michelle Kelly as Mary Poppins, Gavin Lee as Bert, David Haig as Mr Banks, Linzi Hateley as Winifred Banks and a young Carrie Hope Fletcher as Jane Banks. The show was directed by Richard Eyre, and choreographed and co-directed by Matthew Bourne.

She played Pearl in the musical Daddy Cool in 2007, followed by Mme Thenardier in Les Misérables in 2008.

In 2010, La Barrie took part in the Royal Shakespeare Company's workshops for the musical Matilda in the role of Mrs Phelps, performing the role in Stratford-upon-Avon and when the show transferred to the Cambridge Theatre in London.

In 2018, La Barrie took over the role of Madame Morrible in Wicked, in the show's 12th year, starring alongside Alice Fearn (Elphaba), Sophie Evans (Glinda) and Bradley Jaden (Fiyero).

In 2019, it was announced that La Barrie would star as Angelique, the Nurse, having previously workshopped the role, in the Max Martin jukebox musical & Juliet. The musical premiered at the Manchester Opera House, where it played between 10 September and 12 October 2019. La Barrie continued in the role when the musical transferred to the Shaftesbury Theatre on the West End. The musical opened on 2 November 2019, in previews, ahead of an official opening on 20 November 2019. After the show was suspended in March 2020 because of the COVID-19 pandemic, La Barrie returned to the role when performances resumed on 24 September 2021. On 26 March 2022, La Barrie departed the show.

In February 2022, La Barrie appeared in the role of Mama Rose in a special one-night-only concert performance of Gypsy at the Alexandra Palace in London. She shared the role with six other actresses, Tracie Bennett, Keala Settle, Nichola Hughes, Rebecca Lock, Samantha Spiro and Sally Ann Triplett.

La Barrie reprised her role of Angelique in the North American premiere of & Juliet, where it played at the Princess of Wales Theatre in Toronto between 22 June 2022 and 14 August 2022. She continued with the role when the musical transferred to Broadway, marking La Barrie's Broadway debut. The musical opened on Broadway at the Stephen Sondheim Theatre on 28 October 2022, ahead of an official opening on 17 November 2022.

From February 2024 to February 2025, La Barrie played Hermes in the West End production of Hadestown. She performed her final performance on 9 February 2025, the same day she also won a WhatsOnStage Award for Best Supporting Performer in a Musical for her performance as Hermes.

In March 2026 it was announced that La Barrie would join the cast of Into the Woods at the Bridge Theatre in the role of The Witch, during the last few months of the show. La Barrie joined new cast members Rachel Tucker as the Baker's Wife and John Owen-Jones as the Narrator/Mysterious Man. The show announced its West End transfer in April.

In summer 2026, La Barrie was part of the cast of Cats at Regent's Park Open Air Theatre in London as Old Deuteronomy. The cast also included Gary Wilmot as Gus: the Theatre Cat and Rachael Wooding as Grizabella. The production embarked on a UK tour, after the season at the Open Air Theatre.

=== Music ===
Under her birth name, Melanie Hudson, she has released two calypso LP records, which were produced and released in Trinidad. The first of these, Comin' Out, featured as its lead single "I Will Always Be There For You", which became a major hit in Trinidad.

Her second LP, Melanie, was released in 1992.

== Acting credits ==
=== Theatre ===
Year	Production	Role	Location	Category	Ref.
2003	Ragtime	Ensemble	Piccadilly Theatre	West End	
2004	Ma Rainey's Black Bottom	Ma Rainey	Liverpool Playhouse	Regional	
2004	Mary Poppins	Mrs Corry	Bristol Hippodrome	World premiere	
2004-2006	Mary Poppins	Mrs Corry	Prince Edward Theatre	West End	
2006-2007	Daddy Cool	Pearl	Shaftesbury Theatre	West End - world premiere	
2008	Rue Magique	Desdemona	King's Head Theatre	Off-West End	
2007-2008	Les Misérables	Madame Thénardier	Queen's Theatre	West End	
2009	Once on This Island	Mama Euralie	Birmingham Repertory Theatre, Nottingham Playhouse, Hackney Empire	Regional	
2009-2010	A Christmas Carol	Mrs Old Joe	Birmingham Repertory Theatre	Regional	
2010	Smokey Joe's Cafe	—	Landor Theatre	London	
2010-2011	Matilda the Musical	Mrs Phelps	Royal Shakespeare Company (Courtyard Theatre)	World premiere	
2011-2013	Matilda the Musical	Mrs Phelps	Cambridge Theatre	West End	
2011	The Wiz	Addaperle/Aunt Em	New Alexandra Theatre, West Yorkshire Playhouse	Regional	
2014	Guys and Dolls	General Matilda B. Cartwright	Chichester Festival Theatre	Regional	
2014-2015	White Christmas	Martha Watson	West Yorkshire Playhouse	Regional	
2015	Play Mas	Miss Gookool	Orange Tree Theatre	Off-West End	
2015	Bakkhai	Chorus	Almeida Theatre	Off-West End	
2015-2016	The Lorax	Various	The Old Vic	Off-West End - World premiere	
2016	Breakfast at Tiffany's	Madame Spanella	Curve Theatre, UK tour, Theatre Royal Haymarket	Regional, West End	
2017	Fiddler on the Roof, The Story Giant, Romeo and Juliet, The Sum	Various (repertory company)	Everyman Theatre, Liverpool	Regional	
2017-2019	Wicked	Madame Morrible	Apollo Victoria Theatre	West End	
2019	& Juliet	Angélique/Nurse	Manchester Opera House	World premiere	
2019-2022	& Juliet	Angélique/Nurse	Shaftesbury Theatre	West End	
2020	Dick Whittington	Bow Belles	Royal National Theatre	London	
2021	Brother	Cassie	Southwark Playhouse	Off-West End	
2021	The Lorax	Various	The Old Vic	London	
2021	Going Ape	Eve	Union Theatre	Off-West End	
2022	Gypsy	Rose Hovick	Alexandra Palace Theatre	Off-West End	
2022	& Juliet	Angélique/Nurse	Princess of Wales Theatre	Toronto - North American premiere	
2022–2023	& Juliet	Angélique/Nurse	Stephen Sondheim Theatre	Broadway	
2024-2025	Hadestown	Hermes	Lyric Theatre	West End	
2025	Mary Page Marlowe	Nurse	The Old Vic	Off-West End	
2026	Into the Woods	The Witch	Bridge Theatre	London	
2026	Cats	Old Deuteronomy	Regent's Park Open Air Theatre	London	

=== Film and television ===
Year	Title	Role	Notes
2004	Casualty	Anita	2 episodes: S18.E23; S18.E24
2015	London Road	Resident	Directed by Rufus Norris
2001-2025	EastEnders	Resus Nurse, Dr Kelleher	TV Series, 5 episodes
2025	Riot Women	Veronica	TV Series, 1 episode
2026	Emmerdale	Carol Lambert (HR Officer)	TV Series, 5 episodes - present

== Awards and nominations ==
Year	Work	Award	Category	Result	Ref.
2020	& Juliet	WhatsOnStage Award	Best Supporting Actress in a Musical	Nominated	
2022	& Juliet	Dora Award	Outstanding Performance in a Featured Role	Nominated	
2025	Hadestown	WhatsOnStage Award	Best Supporting Performer in a Musical	Won	
