= Leon Parris =

British writer, composer and actor (born 1981)

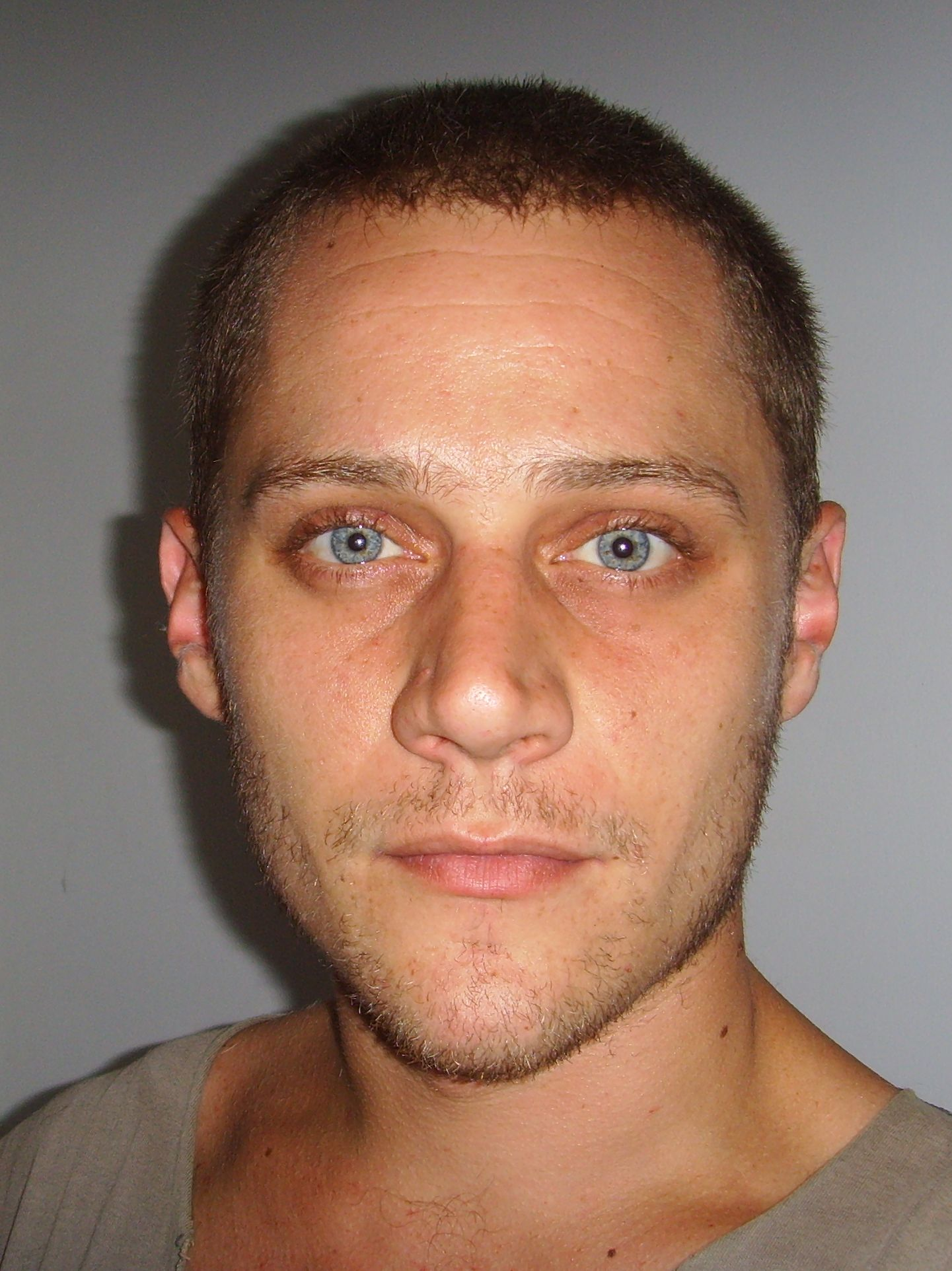
- Leon Parris, Barcelona 20 February 2010
- Born: 1 February 1981 (age 45); Bedford, England, U.K.
- Occupations: Writer, composer, actor
- Writing career
- Period: Since 1999
- Notable works: Wolfboy, Monte Cristo (musical), and Scary Musical

Leon Parris (born 1 February 1981) is an English writer, composer, and actor.

== Early life and education ==
Parris was brought up in Bedford, England, and was educated at the Bedford Modern School.

== Career ==
=== Musical theatre ===
- Bananaman (London, 2017)
- Scary Musical – standIN'OVATION, Belfast (2009)
  - Scary Musical – standIN'OVATION, Waterfront Hall, Belfast (2010)
- Epic Musical – standIN' OVATION, Belfast (2010)
- The Famous Five – Tabard Theatre in Chiswick, directed by Russell Labey (2009)
- Wolfboy – adaptation of Brad Fraser play, directed by Russell Labey, previews at Tabard Theatre and run at Edinburgh Fringe Festival (2009)
  - Wolfboy – off-West End staging at Trafalgar Studios London (2010)
- Stig of the Dump – directed by Russell Labey (2008)
- Monte Cristo – with Jon Smith, Birmingham Hippodrome (2005)
- The Fallen – Bedford Modern School (1999)

=== Acting roles ===
Year	Title	Role	Director	Playwright	Theatre
1988	A Christmas Carol	Young Scrooge	.	.	Mermaid Theatre
1989	Whistle Down the Wind	.	.	Russell Labey and Richard Taylor	
1993	Bugsy Malone	Cagey Joe	.		National Youth Music Theatre
2000	New Boy	Barry	.	William Sutcliffe	Edinburgh Festival

=== Awards, bursaries, and nominations ===
- 2000 winner – The Vivian Ellis Award for Best Musical: Going Once (2000)
- 2000 winner – The Really Useful Group Award for Most Promising Young Writer: Going Once (2000)
- 2000 winner – The Warner Chappell Award
- 2000 winner – The Mercury Workshops Award
- 2001 recipient – £10,000 Cameron Mackintosh Bursary
