= Inel Tomlinson =

British actor and comedian (born 1984)

- Born: Inel Julian Tomlinson; 4 September 1984 (age 42)
- Occupations: Actor, Stand-up Comedian, Television Presenter, Radio Presenter
- Years active: 2006–present

Twitch information
- Channel: Inelious
- Followers: 3400
- Website: inel.tv

Inel Julian Tomlinson (born 4 September 1984) is an actor, TV personality and stand-up comedian from London, best known for being one half of Johnny and Inel alongside Johnny Cochrane, the UK's first black comedy double act. The duo are known on kids TV for their CBBC TV comedy show The Johnny and Inel Show and Junior Vets on Call. In 2015, the pair joined the Fubar Radio team and took over the airwaves with their Thursday afternoon 'Live & Loud' show. After a successful year at Fubar Radio, the duo were invited to join the all-new Virgin Radio UK lineup in a prime Friday night 7pm-11pm slot.

As a voiceover artist, Tomlinson voiced 'Rex' in CBeebies 'Footy Pups' and has voiced Agent A Gent in the CBBC Zig & Zag cartoon released in April 2016.

Tomlinson has also appeared on Videogame Nation and is a regular on the stand-up comedy circuit, performing around the country at gigs for Jongleurs, The Glee Club and many more.

His background in stand-up comedy led him to set up Kinetic Comedy, a multicultural monthly event that showcases up and coming comedy acts interspersed with games, competitions and music.

Since 2015, Tomlinson has appeared twice in the CBBC panel show The Dog Ate My Homework. In April 2017, he appeared in a promotional video for the return of PaRappa the Rapper.

He appeared in Deborah Isitt’s 2022 film Christmas on Mistletoe Farm as Mo, along with Scott Garnham, Kathryn Drysdale and Ashley Jensen.
