= Debbie Isitt =

British comic writer, film director and performer

- Born: 1966 (age 59–60); Birmingham, England
- Occupations: Writer, film director and performer
- Known for: Nativity! film series
- Spouse: Nicky Ager
- Children: Sydney Isitt-Ager

Debbie Isitt (born 1966) is an English comic writer, film director, screenwriter, composer, lyricist and performer.

== Early life and education ==
Isitt was born in Birmingham. She went to Our Lady of Fatima Primary School and Lordswood Girls Secondary School. Later, she studied a two-year course at Coventry Centre for the Performing Arts, graduating in 1985.

== Career ==
Isitt is best known for her Christmas comedy films, the Nativity! series, of which she has written and directed four to date. Prior to that, she wrote BAFTA award-winning television adaptation of Jacqueline Wilson's book, The Illustrated Mum, the stage play The Woman Who Cooked Her Husband, and the feature films Nasty Neighbours and Confetti.

Earlier in her career, just after her graduation, she joined the Cambridge Experimental Theatre company and toured Europe for a year performing Shakespeare. She then founded the Snarling Beasties company and spent the next 15 years writing, directing and performing in plays they took around the world. In 2001, she adapted Dodie Smith’s The Hundred and One Dalmatians for the stage.

Nativity!, Isitt's third feature film, starring Martin Freeman, was released in November 2009. It became the most successful British independent film of the year. The sequel, Nativity 2: Danger in the Manger, starred David Tennant. Released in November 2012, and was also a financial success, making twice the amount at the UK box office as the original. Two further sequels, Nativity 3: Dude, Where's My Donkey? and Nativity Rocks!, were released in 2014 and 2018 respectively. They were financial successes, but received broadly negative reviews from critics.

In 2017, Isitt wrote, directed and composed the music for a stage musical based on the first film in the Nativity! with her partner Nicky Ager. Nativity! The Musical ran from 20 October until 6 January and starred Daniel Boys, Simon Lipkin and Sarah Earnshaw. The show returned for a second tour in 2018. Simon Lipkin returned in the lead role as Mr. Poppy, joined by Scott Garnham and Ashleigh Gray. Garnham and Gray for a third tour in 2019, with Scott Paige playing the show's comic lead. However, Lipkin returned to reprise his role for the Hammersmith Apollo run of the show. The musical ran at the Birmingham Rep for the 2022 Christmas season, after initially being postponed from 2020 and 2021 due to the COVID-19 pandemic.

Isitt also directed the ITV series Love and Marriage, and more recently wrote and directed the family comedy Christmas On Mistletoe Farm for Netflix. The film stars Scott Garnham, Scott Paige and Kathryn Drysdale.

On 21 March 2023, it was announced that I Should Be So Lucky, a jukebox musical making use of the songs by Stock Aitken Waterman, was due to open later in the year at the Manchester Opera House and then proceed on a UK tour. The original story and script was written by Isitt and she was announced as its director.

In February 2025, Debbie was announced as director of the new musical, Military Wives, based on the 2019 film of the same name. Isitt also penned the script for the show which was announced with a limited season at The York Theatre Royal with previews beginning 10 September 2025 before an official opening on the 16 of the same month followed by closure on 27 September. The show is being produced by York Theatre Royal in association with The Everyman Theatre, Cheltenham and The Buxton Opera House. A jukebox musical, the show will feature arrangements and orchestrations by Debbie's previous collaborator George Dyer.

== Personal life ==
Isitt has a long-term partner, Nicky Ager, who works as the editor for her films as well as composing the music and writing the songs alongside Isitt. Together, they have a daughter, Sydney Isitt-Ager, who appeared in the first three Nativity films.

Isitt was pregnant during filming for her first feature film Nasty Neighbours.

Isitt is a cousin of the footballer Darren Wassall.

== Awards and honours ==
In 2005, Isitt won a BAFTA for Best Adapted Screenplay as well as an International Emmy for her work on The Illustrated Mum.

Confetti received a nomination at The British Comedy Awards.

Nativity! won two Richard Attenborough Film Awards and was also nominated as Best Breakthrough Movie at The National Movie Awards.

In 2023, Warwick University awarded Isitt an honorary doctorate for her work in championing the creative potential of the West Midlands. She is now a Doctor of Letters (DLitt).

== Controversy ==
Actors Robert Webb and Olivia Colman publicly criticised the film Confetti upon release. The pair play a couple of naturists planning their wedding, and claim they were misled about the amount of nudity involved in the film. Webb said in an interview that Isitt had told them their genitals would all be pixelated in the final film, and was not aware until the screening that this was not the case. Colman and Webb started legal proceedings against the filmmaker, but these were eventually abandoned when the actors concluded it was too late and the lengthy process would prevent them from "pretending it didn't happen".
