= Jemma Churchill =

English actress (born 1960)

- Born: Birth place London, England
- Education: Guildhall School of Music and Drama
- Occupations: Stage actress; Television actress
- Years active: 1984–present
- Children: Marlon Percy [son]; Adelaide Percy [daughter]; recording artistes
- Parent(s): Donald Churchill; Pauline Yates

Jemma Churchill is an English television, theatre, film and radio actress, best known for her role as Sandra in the award-winning British sitcom for BBC Alma's Not Normal, Grandma Pat in the ITV comedy G'wed and Nanny Lyons in Upstairs Downstairs,

== Early life and education ==
Churchill is the daughter of London-born actor/writer Donald Churchill and Liverpool actress Pauline Yates, best known for her portrayal of Elizabeth Perrin in The Fall and Rise of Reginald Perrin.

Following training at the Guildhall School of Music and Drama in London, Churchill spent a year singing in pubs and working men's clubs in the East End under the name 'Jemma Churchill – the Cockney Sparrow'.

== Career ==
=== Television and film ===
Churchill's first professional job was as a Borstal girl in the film Scrubbers directed by Mai Zetterling. She appeared as herself in the Doctor Who 50th Celebrations in Peter Davisons' The Five(ish) Doctors Reboot for the BBC.

Churchill's first television appearance was in the BBC sitcom No Place Like Home with William Gaunt and Martin Clunes. She then played guest parts in John Mortimer's Paradise Postponed as Cissy Bigwell (1986) and Audrey Wystan, Rumpole's niece in Rumpole of the Bailey (1991).

In the 1990s Churchill played Elsie in Poirot in The Adventure of the Cheap Flat in the sitcom The Brittas Empire (1994) and Doctor Swain in the comedy series Waiting For God (1994). She has made guest appearances on EastEnders, Footballers Wives, Midsomer Murders, Murder in Mind, Jonathan Creek, The Bill, Kiss Me Kate, Waterloo Road, Red Dwarf and Jekyll. She played Nanny Lyons in the BBC period drama series Upstairs Downstairs.

Churchill appeared in the drama documentary The Plot To Bring Down Britain's Planes for Channel 4. In 2015, she appeared as Freda in the new series of Agatha Raisin for Sky TV, and in the new series of the BBC comedy Still Open All Hours as Mrs. Thing alongside David Jason.

Churchill played Barnaby's Nanny in the 2018 Christmas film, Nativity ROCKS! The fourth film in Debbie Isitt's Nativity series.

Churchill set up Two Tree Island Films, and produced and starred in the short film Beached which won the Southend-on-Sea Short Film Fiction award 2011.

In 2021, Jemma played Sandra in the BBC Two sitcom Alma's Not Normal. In 2025 She returned as (F*ck Off) Sandra, Joan's passive aggressive neighbour in (BBC Two) award-winning comedy drama Alma's Not Normal series 2.

In series three, episode four of BBC Three's Ladhood titled 'Initiative' she played Mrs. Peacock. The episode was first broadcast on 26 September 2022 after being postponed due to the funeral of Queen Elizabeth II.

In October 2022, she portrayed Aileen McAllister in the BBC soap opera Doctors.

Starting on 8 February 2024, she appeared as series regular Pat in ITVX comedy series G'wed. Jemma reprised her role in series two of G'wed, which premiered on ITVX as well as being broadcast on ITV2 from 6 February 2025.

=== Stage and radio ===
In September 2015, Churchill appeared at the Finborough Theatre in Horniman's Choice. Churchill plays a lonely wife and mother in one of the plays in Horniman's Choice, The Old Testament and the New. Churchill also appeared with Janie Dee in 84 Charing Cross Road at Salisbury Playhouse. She has also appeared in The Hoard Festival New Vic Theatre's Appetite, a musical starring Miriam Margolyes and Tamsin Greig; as Belinda in Noises Off at Wolsey Theatre; Polina in The Notebook Of Trigorin; Factors Unforeseen at the Orange Tree Theatre, Richmond; Barbara in Ayckbourn's Things We Do For Love; and the surgeon in Having A Ball.

Churchill has recorded many radio plays for BBC Radio including The Good Companions, Potting On, Hercule Poirot Series, Vanity Fair, The Idiot, Brideshead Revisited and Brief Lives. She voiced Lady Forleon in the Big Finish Doctor Who audio story Creatures of Beauty with Peter Davison, Safira Valtris in Breaking Bubbles with Colin Baker, and Praska in Signs and Wonders with Sylvester McCoy. She played all nine female roles in Blake's 7 The Liberator Chronicles and played Helena Eidelman in The Judgement Of Sherlock Holmes all for Big Finish.

For Brunel's Bicentenary, Churchill toured along the Great Western Railway route with her site-specific one woman show The Engineer's Corset about Isambard Kingdom Brunel, Engineering and Victorian Women. She played Dorothy Wordsworth in her one-woman show Dolly by Donald Churchill at the Theatre by the Lake, Keswick.

She starred in Jemma Kennedy's The Gift and Annie Horniman's well-received The Price of Coal and The Old Testament and the New.

In 2022, Churchill returned to Nativity! The Musical at The Birmingham Rep Theatre playing Mrs. Bevan. This is the same role she originated on the 2017 tour and played for a second time in the 2018 touring production of the show.

Prior to Nativity!, Jemma appeared the play 'Diary Of A Somebody' at Seven Dials Playhouse from 22 March - 30 April 2022. She received praise for her multi-rolling in the show.

Churchill reunited with director Debbie Isitt to tour with I Should Be So Lucky from 1 November 2023 until 11 May 2024 playing Ivy.

From 30 September 2025 Jemma played Mrs Richards in the John Cleese-penned Fawlty Towers: The Play on a UK tour until 1 August 2026. The role was originally played by Joan Sanderson in the episode 'Communication Problems' from the sitcom of the same name.

== Television filmography ==
- No Place Like Home (1984) as Lesley
- Gems (3 episodes, 1985) as Rebecca Springett
- Paradise Postponed (1986) as Cissy Bigwell
- Agatha Christie's Poirot (1990) as Elsie
- Rumpole of the Bailey (1991) as Audrey Wystan
- Waiting for God (1994) as Dr Swain
- The Brittas Empire (1994) as Philippa Belmonte
- McCallum (1997) as Social Worker
- Bugs (1997) as Doctor
- Strange But True? (1997) as Reconstruction Cast: Twins
- EastEnders (1997) as Dr. Ericson
- The Bill (1990–1998) (1990) as Babs, (1998) as Janice Fields
- Jonathan Creek (1998) as Second Therapist
- Dangerfield (1998) as 1st Academic
- Kiss Me Kate (1999) as Emma
- Red Dwarf (TV series) (1999) as First Woman Officer
- Where There's Smoke (2000) as Reverend Wilmore
- Murder in Mind (2002) as DS Jane Shepherd
- Midsomer Murders (2003) as Maisie Cullen
- Footballers' Wives (2004) as Doctor
- Murder in Suburbia (2004) as Anne James
- Holby City (2005) as Karen Hames
- Heartbeat (2006) as Stella Hill
- Jekyll (2007) as Obstetrician
- Waterloo Road (2009) as Ms Fellows
- Beached (2011) as Mum
- Upstairs Downstairs (3 episodes, 2010–2012) as Nanny Lyons
- The Five(ish) Doctors Reboot (2013) as Jemma Churchill
- Burn the Clock (2013) as Woman in crowd
- Doctors (2002, 2010, 2014, 2022) as Eleanor Wainwright, Angela Pike, Sheila White, Aileen McAllister
- Agatha Raisin: The Quiche of Death (2014) as Freda
- Between Places (2014) as Cheryl
- Deny Everything (2015) as the Boss
- Still Open All Hours (2015) as Mrs. Thing
- Doctor Who (2021) as Jean
- Alma's Not Normal (2021–24) as Sandra
- Ladhood (2022) as Mrs. Peacock
- G'wed (2024) as Grandma Pat
