= Whatever Makes You Happy =

Whatever Makes You Happy may refer to:

- Whatever Makes You Happy, a 2004 album by Jeff Lang
- Whatever Makes You Happy, a novel by William Sutcliffe
- "Whatever Makes You Happy", a song by Powderfinger from the album Odyssey Number Five
- "Whatever Makes You Happy", a song by The Miracles
- "Whatever Makes You Happy", a song by Sugababes from the album Three
