= New Boy =

New Boy or newboys or variation, may refer to:

== Entertainment ==
- New Boy (novel), a 1996 novel by William Sutcliffe
- New Boy (play), a 2000 adaptation of the William Sutcliffe novel
- The New Boy (play), an 1894 comic farce by Arthur Law
- New Boy (film), a 2007 short film

=== Music ===
- New Boyz, U.S. rapper duo
- New Boy (EP), a 1994 EP by the Connells
- Newboys (song), 1978 song by The Adverts from the punk album Crossing the Red Sea with The Adverts
- New Boy (song), 1999 song by Pu Shu

== Other uses ==
- NewBoy, FZCO (Arabic: نيوبوي), Emirati company
