= The Lorax (disambiguation) =

The Lorax is a 1971 children's book by Dr. Seuss.

The Lorax, Lorax, or LORAX may also refer to:

== Adaptations of the book ==
- The Lorax (TV special), a 1972 TV animated short based on the book
- The Lorax (film), a 2012 animated film based on the book
  - The Lorax (soundtrack), the soundtrack of the film
- The Lorax (play), a 2015 stage adaptation of the book

== Other uses ==
- LORAX, a robotics project of Carnegie Mellon University
- Lori Black (born 1954), American musician, also known as Lorax
