= I Should Be So Lucky (musical) =

British jukebox musical

- Promotional Poster for Original Tour
- Music: Stock Aitken Waterman
- Lyrics: Stock Aitken Waterman
- Book: Debbie Isitt
- Basis: The music of Stock Aitken Waterman
- Premiere: 1 November 2023: Manchester Opera House
- Productions: 2023/24 UK tour

I Should Be So Lucky is a British jukebox musical written by Debbie Isitt, which uses the music of the pop writing team Stock Aitken Waterman.

== Creative team ==
The show is written and directed by the creator of the Nativity! franchise, Debbie Isitt, choreographed by Jason Gilkison, the creative director of Strictly Come Dancing, and features orchestrations and musical direction from George Dyer, who has previously collaborated with Isitt on Nativity! The Musical. The show also features set and costume design from Tom Rogers, light design from Howard Hudson, Ben Harrison serves as the sound designer and Anne Vosser as Casting Director. The musical is being produced by Ambassador Theatre Group and Gavin Kalin Productions.

== Plot ==
The original story for the show was devised by Isitt. It follows a young couple, Ella and Nathan, who are madly in love. They are about to take the next step in their relationship, marriage. That is, until it all goes wrong.

== Musical numbers ==
I Should Be So Lucky makes use of the back catalogue of songs written and produced by Stock Aitken Waterman. Before the full soundtrack was known, WhatsOnStage said the small selection of these songs that were going to be in the show would include "no less than ten number one singles." More specifically, the titular song "I Should Be So Lucky", "Never Gonna Give You Up", "Love in the First Degree" and "Especially for You" were the first to be announced.

=== Songs used in the musical ===
- "Venus" - Bananarama
- "If You Were with Me Now" - Kylie Minogue & Keith Washington
- "You Spin Me Round (Like a Record)" - Dead or Alive
- "Never Gonna Give You Up" - Rick Astley
- "Showing Out (Get Fresh at the Weekend)" - Mel and Kim
- "Respectable" - Mel and Kim
- "That's the Way It Is" - Mel and Kim
- "Better Off Without You" - Hazell Dean
- "Whatever I Do (Wherever I Go)" - Hazell Dean
- "He Ain't No Competition" - Brother Beyond
- "This Time I Know It's for Real" - Donna Summer
- "Toy Boy" - Sinitta
- "Love in the First Degree" - Bananarama
- "You'll Never Stop Me Loving You" - Sonia
- "Too Many Broken Hearts" - Jason Donovan
- "The Heaven I Need" - The Three Degrees
- "Especially for You" - Kylie Minogue & Jason Donovan
- "I Should Be So Lucky" - Kylie Minogue
- "Step Back in Time" - Kylie Minogue
- "Better the Devil You Know" - Kylie Minogue
- "Tell Tale Signs" - Kylie Minogue
- "Never Too Late" - Kylie Minogue
- "Hand On Your Heart" - Kylie Minogue

== Production history ==
=== 2023/24 UK & Ireland tour ===
The world premiere production is planned to open with a residency at the Manchester Opera House on 1 November 2023. This will be followed by a UK & Ireland tour that will begin at the Wales Millennium Centre, followed by Theatre Royal, Plymouth, the Grand Theatre, Leeds and finally at the Mayflower Theatre, Southampton. According to the initial announcement, this tour was due to close on 27 January 2024 but more dates were subsequently added extending the tour to 11 May 2024. These further dates included stops at The New Wimbledon Theatre, The New Theatre, Oxford, Kings Theatre, Glasgow, Hull New Theatre, The Milton Keynes Theatre, The Southend Cliffs Pavilion, The New Victoria Theatre, Woking, Churchill Theatre, Bromley, The Alexandra, Birmingham, The Bristol Hippodrome, The Liverpool Empire, Sunderland Empire Theatre, His Majesty's Theatre, Aberdeen, and finally the Bord Gáis Energy Theatre, Dublin.

== Cast ==
Cast by Anne Vosser, the original cast for the show was announced on 18 July after an official press launch at Manchester's Lawn Club in the same city as the show's premiere.

=== 2023/24 UK tour cast ===
- Lucie-Mae Sumner as Ella
- Billy Roberts as Nathan
- Jamie Chapman as Spencer
- Jemma Churchill as Ivy
- Jessica Daley as Britney
- Dominic Anderson as Revel Harrington III
- Matthew Croke as Nadeem
- Melissa Jacques as Shelly
- Scott Paige as Michael
- Giovanni Spano as Ash
- Kayla Carter as Bonnie
- Gary Davis as Big Mike
- Anna Unwin as Olivia
- Ralph Bogard as Hassan
- Sydney Isitt-Ager as Helen

It was also announced that Kylie Minogue, the singer of "I Should Be So Lucky", would appear in a "specially created digital character."
