= Alan Morrissey =

British actor (born 1982)

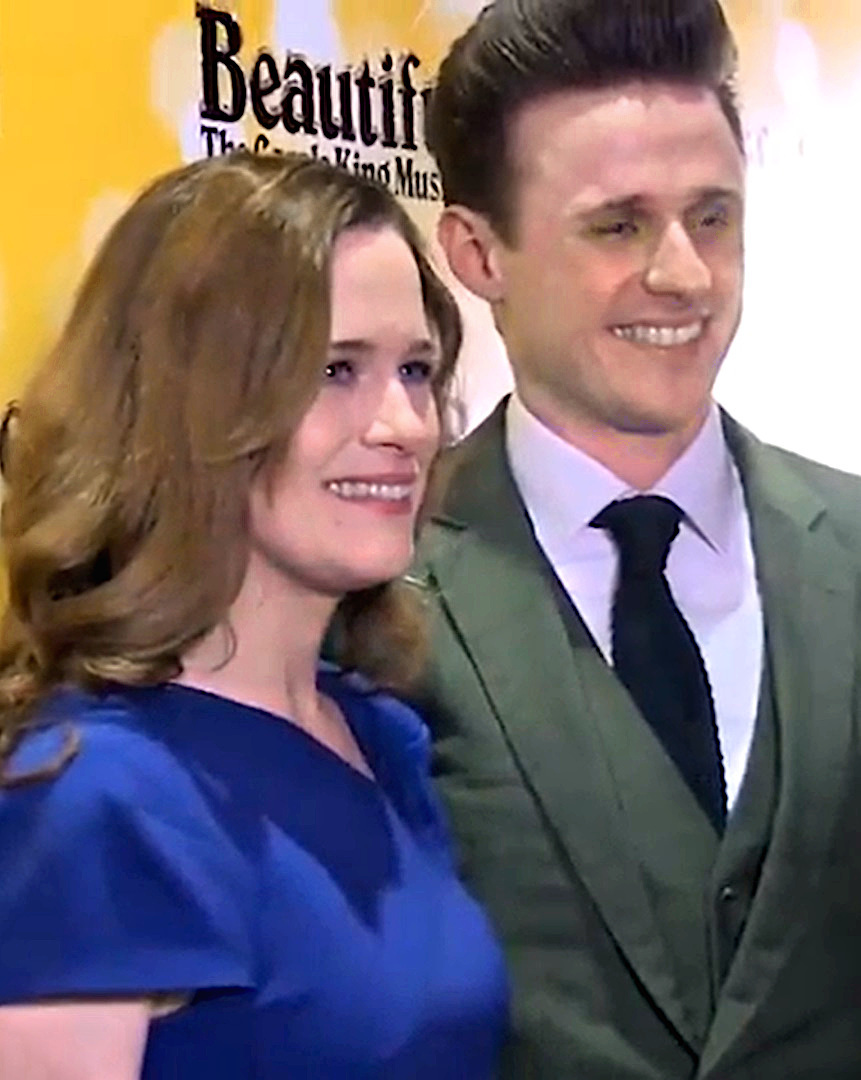
- Morrissey with Katie Brayben in 2015
- Born: 9 October 1982 (age 43); Stockport, Greater Manchester, England
- Occupation: Actor
- Years active: 2004–present

Alan Morrissey (born 9 October 1982) is a British actor. He grew up in Stockport at the Farmers Arms Pub, of which his parents were the licensees, before moving to Oldham. Morrissey trained at Bristol Old Vic Theatre School. In 2002 and again in 2003, Dame Maggie Smith and The Fenton Arts Trust awarded him the bursary for talented potentials. He graduated from the Old Vic Theatre School in 2004.

== Career ==
He made his film debut in The League of Gentlemen's Apocalypse, in 2005, starring alongside Steve Pemberton and Bruno Langley. Morrissey became best known for his television debut as Nick Van Barr in the BBC medical drama series Holby City. He left the show in 2010, after 18 episodes.

On 2 September 2013, it was announced Morrissey is to play the role of Max in the West End musical I Can't Sing! The X Factor Musical, which opened in March 2014 at the London Palladium. Other principals included Nigel Harman and Cynthia Erivo.

Morrissey is currently a member of the London-based artistic collective The Factory Theatre Company. He has appeared in their performances of 'Round One', 'Round Two' and 'The Seagull Experiment' in venues across London as well as performing in 'Boiling Frogs' at the Southwark Playhouse. Other Factory members include Alex Hassell, Catherine Bailey and Laura Rees.

== Acting credits ==
Filmography
Year	Title	Role	Notes
2005	The League of Gentlemen's Apocalypse	Johnny	
2009	Holby City	Nicky Van Barr	
2010	Jacob	Allen	
2010	Doctors	Justin Cook	
2012	Land Girls	Clifford Molloy	
2013	Endeavour	Denis Bradley	
2014–2017	Holby City	Kyle Greenham	

Theatre
Year	Title	Role	Venue	Ref.
2004	Salad Days	Timothy	Bristol Old Vic	
2004	Much Ado About Nothing	Claudio	Salisbury Playhouse	
2005	Solstice	Adie	Royal Shakespeare Company	
2008	Romeo and Juliet	Romeo	Shakespeare's Globe	
2008	The Horse Marines	Steve	Theatre Royal, Plymouth	
2012	Sixty Five Miles	Rich	Paines Plough	
2014	I Can't Sing!	Max	London Palladium	
