= The Woman Who Cooked Her Husband =

Comedy play by Debbie Isitt

- Cover of the Published Play Script
- Original language: English (UK)
- Written by: Debbie Isitt
- Characters: Hillary, Kenneth & Laura
- Genre: Dark Comedy

Premiere
- Date: Early 1990's
- Place: Edinburgh Festival Fringe Festival
- Directed by: Debbie Isitt (originally)

The Woman Who Cooked Her Husband is a dark comedy play by Debbie Isitt.

== Plot summary ==
Kenneth and Hillary have been married for twenty years but, in his middle age, Ken find himself spending more and more time with Laura. After juggling both of these relationships, Kenneth is forced to leave Hillary. Initially, Laura is everything that he could have wanted but the one problem is she can't cook. So, when Hillary invites the pair for a meal, he accepts, unaware of what she has planned to serve.

== Production information ==
The Woman Who Cooked Her Husband is written by Debbie Isitt; it has previously been directed by her as well.

It was first seen in the early 1990s at the Edinburgh Fringe followed by the Royal Court Theatre. Since then, there have been many different productions across the globe. A Singaporean production hit headlines for taking inspiration from the plot and performing the play in a café.

The play, set in the 1970s, features only three characters: Hillary, Kenneth and Laura. For the show's widely well received West End run at The Ambassadors Theatre, then The New Ambassadors Theatre, in 2002 these characters were played by Alison Steadman, Michael Attwell and Daisy Donovan respectively to positive reviews.
