= A Knight's Tale (musical) =

- The Musical
- Poster for the Original UK production
- Music: Various
- Lyrics: Various
- Book: Brona C Titley
- Basis: Film A Knight's Tale by Brian Helgeland
- Premiere: 11 April 2025: Manchester Opera House
- Productions: 2025 Manchester

A Knight's Tale The Musical is a jukebox musical written by Brona C Titley, based on the 2001 film of the same name by Brian Helgeland.

== Production history ==
=== World premiere: Manchester (2025) ===
On 23 July 2024, it was announced that the world premiere of the musical will be at the Manchester Opera House, running from 11 April for a limited run until 10 May 2025. The production will be directed by Rachel Kavanaugh, choreographed by Matt Cole set design by Tom Rogers, costume design by Gabriella Slade, lighting design by Howard Hudson, sound design by Matt Peploe, musical direction by Alan Berry and musical supervision, orchestrations, arrangements and additional music by Simon Hale. Casting was announced on 11 February 2025.

== Cast and characters ==
| Character | Manchester |
| Character | 2025 |
|---|---|
| Kate | Emily Benjamin |
| Chaucer | Max Bennett |
| William | Andrew Coshan |
| Roland | Emile Ruddock |
| Prince Edward | Jay Saighal |
| What | Eva Scott |
| Father | Giles Taylor |
| Count Adhemar | Oliver Tompsett |
| Jocelyn | Meesha Turner |
| Sir Ector / Man in Stocks | Ryan Pidgen |

== Musical Numbers ==
Act I

- "We Will Rock You"
- "Let Me Entertain You"
- "Tubthumping"
- "I'm Gonna Be (500 Miles)"
- "I Wanna Dance With Somebody (Who Loves Me)"
- "Take On Me"
- "The One and Only"
- "Holding Out for a Hero"
- "I'm So Excited"
- "Golden Years"
- "Livin' la Vida Loca"
- "Survivor / We Will Rock You" (reprise)

Act II

- "I'm Every Woman"
- "Sweet Dreams (Are Made of This)"
- "Heaven Is a Place on Earth"
- "Don't Speak"
- "Reach"
- "Kiss from a Rose"
- "The Boys Are Back in Town"
- "Because You Loved Me"
- "Rolling in the Deep"
- "Wanted Dead or Alive"
- "Welcome to the Jungle"
- "Mr. Brightside"
