= Oliver Tompsett =

British actor and singer (born 1981)

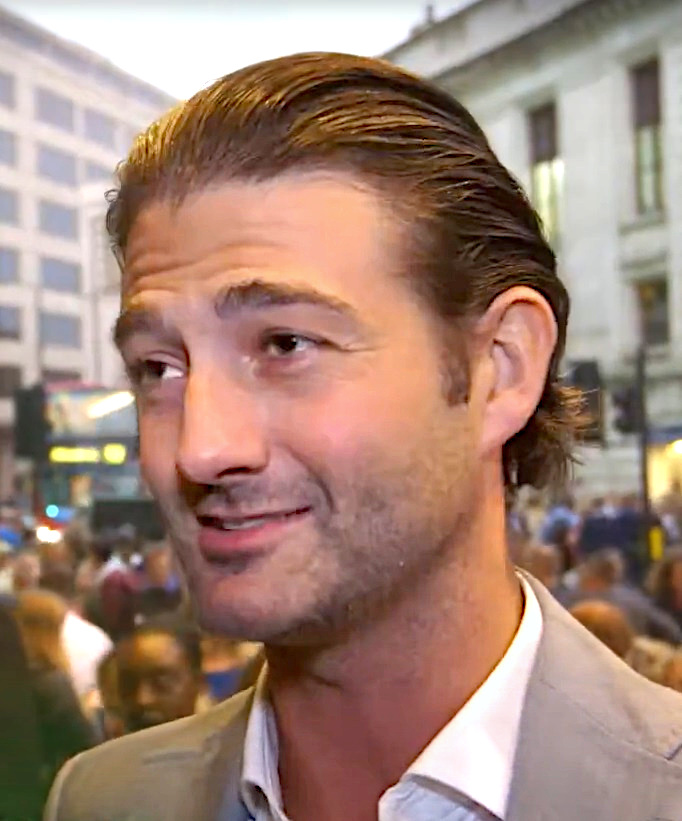
- Tompsett at Wicked 10th Birthday 2016
- Born: 25 August 1981 (age 44); Abingdon, Oxfordshire, England
- Occupations: Actor, singer
- Years active: 2002–current

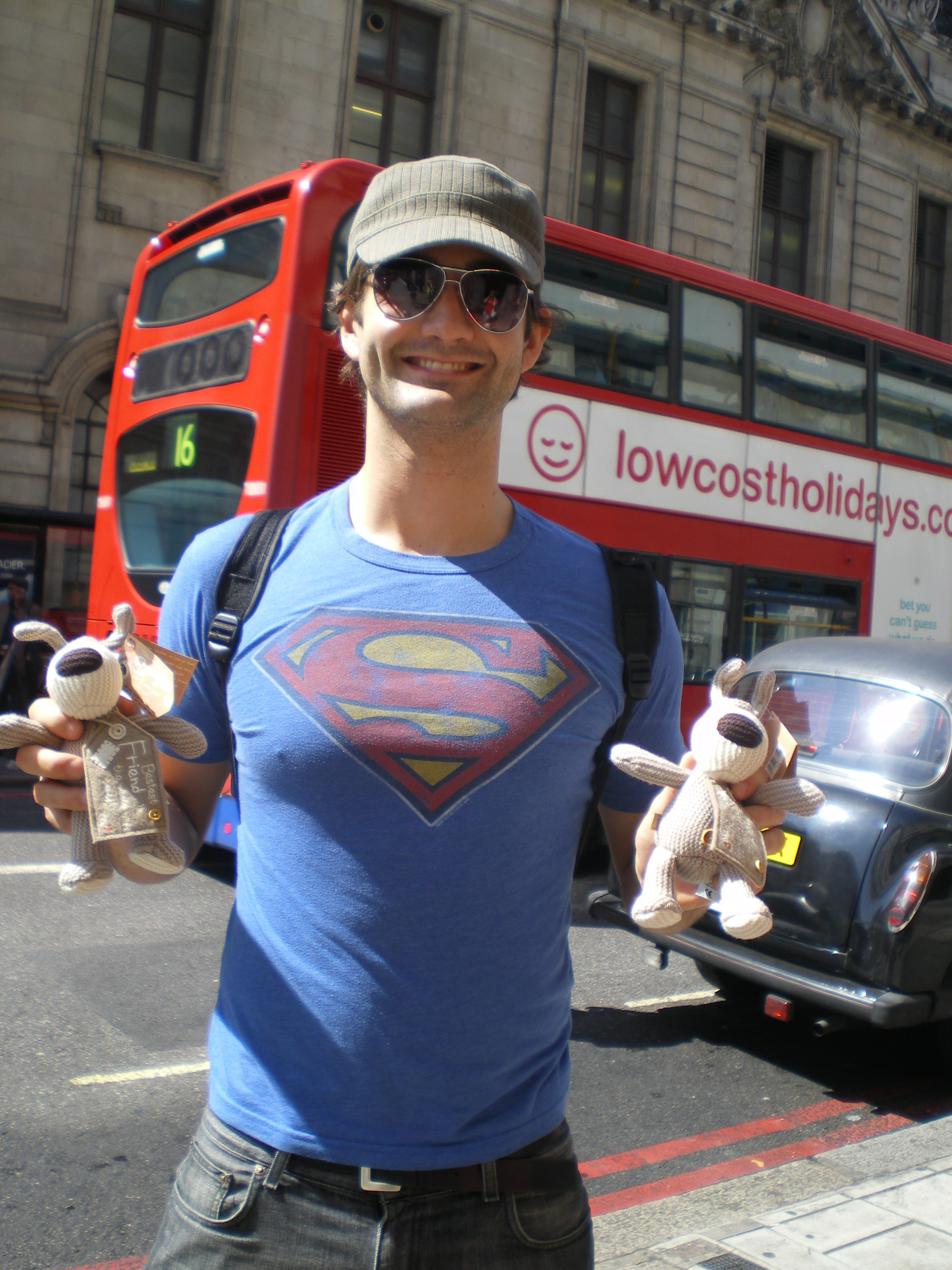
Tompsett in 2007

Oliver Tompsett (born 25 August 1981) is a British actor and singer. He is best known for his work in musical theatre. He originated leading roles in multiple West End productions, including Drew Boley in Rock of Ages and William Shakespeare in & Juliet. (He also later played Shakespeare on Broadway in 2024) In addition, Tompsett is known for his portrayal of Fiyero in Wicked and Galileo in We Will Rock You.

== Early life and education ==
Tompsett was born on 25 August 1981 in Abingdon-on-Thames, Oxfordshire. His father, John, was an engineer and opera singer, and his mother, Judy, who ran a dance studio. He has an older brother, Ben, who is a musician, and a sister, Amy. Tompsett attended John Mason School. He was a member of the Oxfordshire Youth Music Theatre, which sparked his interest in musical theatre, where he performed in youth productions of Me and My Girl, Godspell and Anne of Green Gables. He is a graduate of Arts Educational School, where he played the lead role of "Tony" in West Side Story.

== Career ==
Tompsett made his professional and West End debut in 2002 in the Madness/Tim Firth musical Our House, directed by Matthew Warchus, at London's Cambridge Theatre.

His subsequent London stage appearances include: Benny Andersson and Björn Ulvaeus's musical Mamma Mia!, directed by Phyllida Lloyd, at the Prince of Wales Theatre; Caliph in Kismet, directed by Tiffany Watt-Smith, at the Arcola Theatre, and "Harry Lytton" in Richard Stirling's Over My Shoulder: The Story of Jessie Matthews, directed by Stewart Nicholls, at Wyndhams Theatre.

Immediately prior to joining the original cast of Wicked, in 2006, he appeared in Trevor Nunn's production of Peter Shaffer's The Royal Hunt of the Sun, at the National Theatre.

Tompsett next played the role of Fiyero in the West End musical Wicked, in 2006. He is a member of the original London cast, having previously performed in the ensemble and serving as the understudy for Fiyero, before replacing Adam Garcia in 2007. He played his final performance in 2010 after three and a half years with the production. He was succeeded by Lewis Bradley who played the role until May 2010, when Lee Mead took over.

In 2011, Tompsett originated the role of Drew in the West End production of Rock of Ages. For this role he was nominated for the whatsonstage.com Theatergoers Choice Award for Best Actor in a Musical.

In 2012, Tompsett replaced Noel Sullivan as Galileo in We Will Rock You, and for this role he was nominated for the WhatsOnStage Theatergoers Choice Award for Best Take Over in a Role.

From November 2014 to 24 January 2015, Tompsett played the role of Phil Davis in the musical White Christmas alongside Darren Day in Leeds.

From 16 March to 14 August 2016, Tompsett played the role of Sky Masterson in the West End revival of Guys and Dolls following its transfer to the Phoenix Theatre in London. Tompsett reprised the role for the show's Israeli premiere at the Opera House in Tel Aviv for 10 performances.

In 2019, Tompsett joined the cast of & Juliet as Shakespeare. The world premiere production opened at the Manchester Opera House on 10 September 2019 and closed on 12 October 2019. He continued on in the role when the musical transferred to the West End, where it began performances at the Shaftesbury Theatre on 2 November 2019. At the 2020 WhatsOnStage Awards, he was nominated for Best Actor in a Musical. Tompsett continued in the role for the entire West End run of & Juliet, until the show closed on 25 March 2023, and reprised the role on Broadway, before Drew Gehling, after the original actor, Stark Sands, departed.

On 4 April 2023, Tompsett took over the role of Edward Lewis in the West End production of Pretty Woman. He will continue to play the role until the show's closing on 18 June 2023.

On 18 May 2023, it was announced that Tompsett will star in the musical In Dreams, which will begin performances at Leeds Playhouse on 3 July 2023.

On 11 February 2025, it was announced that Tompsett would star as Count Adhemar in A Knight's Tale, a musical adaptation of the 2001 cult classic film of the same name at Manchester Opera House. Tompsett is expected to reprise his role when the show transfers to London's West End at an as yet unconfirmed later date. He is also been announced to star as P.T. Barnum in the world premiere of The Greatest Showman, a musical based on the hit 2017 film at Bristol Hippodrome in 2026.

== Personal life ==
Tompsett is married to actress Michelle Potter. They met in 2003 while performing in the West End production of Mamma Mia. Their first child, a son named George, born in 2013. Their second child, a daughter named Kaia, was born in February 2017.

Tompsett ran in the 2022 London charity marathon for Parkinson's disease.

== Theatre credits ==
Year	Title	Role	Location	Notes
2002 - 2003	Our House	Callum/Ensemble	Cambridge Theatre	West End
2003 - 2004	Mamma Mia!	Ensemble	Prince of Wales Theatre	West End
2004	Notes From New York	Ensemble	Trafalgar Studios	West End
2004	Cinderella	Prince Charming	Watford Palace Theatre	Regional
2004	Christmas in New York	Performer	Apollo Theatre	West End
2005	Kismet	Caliph	Arcola Theatre	Off-West End
2006	Over My Shoulder: The Story of Jessie Matthews	Harry Lyton	Wyndhams Theatre	West End
2006	The Royal Hunt of the Sun	Ben	Royal National Theatre	
2006 - 2007	Wicked	Ensemble, u/s Fiyero	Apollo Victoria Theatre	West End
2007 - 2010	Wicked	Fiyero	Apollo Victoria Theatre	West End
2011 - 2012	Rock of Ages	Drew Boley	Shaftesbury Theatre	West End
2012 - 2014	We Will Rock You	Galileo	Dominion Theatre	West End
2014 - 2015	White Christmas	Phil Davis	Leeds Grand Theatre	
2016	Guys & Dolls	Sky Masterson	Phoenix Theatre	West End
2016	Guys & Dolls	Sky Masterson	Opera House	Tel Aviv
2016	Disaster!	Chad	Charing Cross Theatre	Benefit concert performance
2017 - 2019	Kinky Boots	Charlie Price	Adelphi Theatre	West End
2019	& Juliet	William Shakespeare	Manchester Opera House	World premiere - pre-West End engagement
2019 - 2023	& Juliet	William Shakespeare	Shaftesbury Theatre	West End
2021	Treason	Robert Catesby	Cadogan Hall	Concert
2023	Pretty Woman: The Musical	Edward Lewis	Savoy Theatre	West End
2023	In Dreams	Ramsey	Leeds Playhouse	World premiere
2023	In Dreams	Ramsey	Ed Mirvish Theatre	North American premiere
2024	& Juliet	William Shakespeare	Stephen Sondheim Theatre	Broadway
2025	A Knight's Tale	Count Adhemar	Manchester Opera House	World premiere - pre-West End engagement
2026	The Greatest Showman	P.T. Barnum	Bristol Hippodrome	World premiere

== Filmography ==
Year	Film	Role	Notes
2017	Hard Way: The Action Musical	Jake	Short film
2018	Show Dogs	Chauncey	Voice role
2021	I Love You, You're Perfect, Now Change	Unknown	

== Awards and nominations ==
Year	Award	Category	Work	Result	Ref.
2012	WhatsOnStage Award	Best Actor in a Musical	Rock of Ages	Nominated	
2013	WhatsOnStage Award	Best Takeover in a Role	We Will Rock You	Nominated	
2020	WhatsOnStage Award	Best Actor in a Musical	& Juliet	Nominated	

== Recordings ==
In 2008 he recorded a song for the CD Act One – Songs from the Musicals of Alexander S. Bermange, an album of 20 new recordings by 26 West End stars, released in October 2008 on Dress Circle Records. He can be heard on the recent Alexander S. Bermange CD singing "More than a Memory" and more.

In late 2008 he released his debut album entitled "Sentimental Heart", with all of the songs written, performed and produced by Tompsett.

Tompsett also recorded the song 'We Are Not Alone' on Terry Pratchett's 'Only You Can Save Mankind', which was released on 23 November 2009.

In May 2010, Tompsett announced on his Official Twitter account that due to the success of his début album, he had signed a record deal with Major Record Label Warner Brothers. His second album was released in 2011.
