= Christmas on Mistletoe Farm =

- Release poster
- Directed by: Debbie Isitt
- Written by: Debbie Isitt
- Produced by: Nick Jones
- Starring: Scott Garnham; Scott Paige; Kathryn Drysdale
- Cinematography: Sean Van Hales
- Edited by: Nicky Ager
- Music by: Debbie Isitt; Nicky Ager
- Production company: Mirrorball Films
- Distributed by: Netflix
- Release date: 23 November 2022
- Running time: 102 minutes
- Country: United Kingdom
- Language: English

Christmas on Mistletoe Farm is a 2022 British Christmas comedy film written and directed by Debbie Isitt. It was released on Netflix on 23 November 2022.

== Plot ==
Matt Cunningham, a widowed father of five, finds out he has inherited a farm. After some persuasion, he leaves his London home for the farm to use it as a retreat to get a pitch that his boss is hampering him for completed on time. However, when he arrives, his farm hand Beano along with his kids and the village people have other ideas than just work.

== Cast ==
- Scott Garnham as Matt Cunningham:
  A widowed father of five who has to face a stark reality in adjusting to village life.
- Scott Paige as Beano:
  An eccentric farm hand who spends a lot of time entertaining Matt's children. With them, he tries to make Matt stay in Cobbledon.
- Kathryn Drysdale as Miss Ashley:
  A Cobbledon vet who develops a quick bond with Matt.
- Ashley Jensen as Ms Fletcher:
  Matt's hard-nosed, Scrooge-like boss.
- Celia Imrie as Miss Womble:
  Head of the village knitting circle who's instrumental in making sure Matt's children settle in.
- Sydney Isitt-Ager as Miss Nerris:
  A Cobbledon teacher who believes learning is for life and can take place anywhere (not just in a classroom).
- Inel Tomlinson as Mo:
  Matt's colleague who is one of the people to persuade him to go to the farm.
- David O'Reilly as Barry The Baker: A Cobbledon Baker who also works as a plumber.

== Production ==
As with Isitt's Nativity! films, much of Christmas on Mistletoe Farm was shot in the West Midlands, with Matt's office was being located in central Birmingham. Exterior scenes of Cobbledon Village were shot in the Cotswolds, and the farm itself was Fulling Mill Farm in north Oxfordshire. Along with writing and directing, Isitt also worked on the original music for the film alongside her partner, composer Nicky Ager.
