= I Can't Sing! =

Musical by Harry Hill and Steve Brown

- The X Factor Musical
- Music: Steve Brown
- Lyrics: Harry Hill; Steve Brown
- Book: Harry Hill
- Basis: The X Factor
- Premiere: 26 March 2014: London Palladium
- Productions: 2014 West End

I Can't Sing! The X Factor Musical was a musical comedy written by Harry Hill, and Steve Brown. Based on the TV series The X Factor, the musical made its West End and world premiere in March 2014, at the London Palladium. Due to low ticket sales, it closed just 6 weeks and 3 days later on 10 May 2014, reportedly losing £4 million.

== Background ==
In December 2012, Harry Hill announced that he was working on a musical based on the talent show The X Factor. The show was confirmed in 2013, and it was announced that the musical would open in London in 2014, and would be called It's Time to Face the Musical!

On 22 May, it was announced the show would now be called I Can't Sing!, and that it would play the London Palladium, with tickets going on sale the following day. The show was written by Harry Hill and is directed by Sean Foley, with choreography by Kate Prince, set design by Es Devlin, costume design by Leah Archer, illusions by Scott Penrose, lighting design by Jon Clark, orchestrations by Chris Egan, sound design by Gareth Owen and sound effects by Ben and Max Ringham. An original score of 19 songs was penned, by Hill with music by Steve Brown.

At the press launch for the show on 2 September 2013, Simon Cowell said of the concept of an X Factor Musical: “I thought the idea of an X Factor musical, if it was too pompous, would be rubbish, and I did not want it to appear like a cash cow. I wanted it to be a celebration of the show but at the same time poke fun at what we do, because you can’t take it too seriously. Harry of all the people was the right person. His observation of the show in the past has been spot on.” People parodied in the show include Simon Cowell, Cheryl Cole, Louis Walsh, and Dermot O'Leary.

== Production history ==
=== West End (2014) ===
On 30 August 2013, it was announced that Nigel Harman would play the role of Simon Cowell, with Alan Morrissey playing the role of Max and Cynthia Erivo playing Chenice the main contestant in the story. The production's first public performance came at the Royal Variety Performance in November 2013, performing a medley of "Please Simon" and "I Can't Sing!", the show's title song. Nigel Harman performed "Fabulous" live at the National Television Awards in January 2014.

I Can't Sing! began rehearsals on 6 January, with previews commencing on 5 March 2014, at the London Palladium, London, before holding its official opening gala night on 26 March. The production had been scheduled to begin previews on 27 February, however the opening two previews were cancelled due to technical issues with the show's set. Following the initial cancellations, the production had to cancel a further preview performance, due to a key mechanism within the set not functioning correctly. Problems continued into previews, with early performances intervals lasting 50 mins, due to set changeovers between acts taking longer than expected and one preview getting cancelled at the interval due to electrical problems. A typical London performance ran two hours and 30 minutes, including one interval of 20 mins.

The production closed on the 10 May, just six weeks and three days after its official opening night. Speaking about the closure, Cowell said “We took a punt and it didn't work out. If I could do things different, I would have gone to local theatres and built up a following. We went in too big a theatre - it's the biggest theatre in the West End."

== Music ==
In September 2013, four tracks were released on SoundCloud and through the shows official website. The songs were "I Can't Sing", "If That's Not Entertainment", "Please Simon" and "I Wanna Be Like Bono", although the latter did not make it into the final show. The musical uses a nine-member orchestra consisting of keyboard, guitar, bass, drums, percussion, trumpets and reeds.

On 1 April 2020 a YouTube user uploaded all the songs from the show onto the site. The released songs were recorded live during one of the performances through a soundboard. Harry Hill acknowledged the leak on his Instagram page, saying he was "very pleased" to hear the songs, while jokingly calling the uploader "naughty" and referring to the musical as a "megaflop".

=== Musical numbers ===
Act I

- "Overture" - Ensemble
- "If That's Not Entertainment" - Young Simon, Ensemble
- "It Could Be Me" - Max, Brenda, Vladimir, Alterboyz, Ensemble
- "Life Is Lovely" - Chenice, Grandpa, Ensemble
- "Please Simon" - Brenda, Vladimir, Alterboyz, Soul Star, Ensemble
- "All Woman" - Brenda, Liam, Ensemble
- "I Can't Sing!" - Chenice, Max, Barlow
- "Better than That" - Hunchback
- "The Hugging Song" - Liam
- "Missing You Already" - Chenice, Max
- "X Factor Fever" - Chenice, Max, Liam, Brenda, Ensemble

Act II

- "Here Come the Judges" - Brunhilde, Liam, Gerrard Smalls, Simon, Jordy, Louis, Ensemble
- "X Factor Fever (Reprise)" - Ensemble
- "Missing You Already (Reprise)" - Chenice, Max
- "Uncomplicated Love" - Simon, Gerrard Smalls, Max, Ensemble
- "Uncomplicated Love (Reprise)" - Barlow
- "Falling In Love With Myself" - Jordy, Chenice, Ensemble
- "Make a Wish... It Happens" - Alterboyz, Ensemble
- "Fabulous" - Simon, Ensemble
- "A Song I Wrote For You" - Max
- "I Can't Sing! (Reprise)" - Brenda, Ensemble
- "X-Tasy" - Chenice, Ensemble
- "Journey to A Dream" - Hunchback, Company
- "You Can Sing!" - All

== Principal roles and cast members ==
Character	Original West End actor
Simon	Nigel Harman
Chenice	Cynthia Erivo
Max	Alan Morrissey
Barlow	Simon Lipkin
Liam O'Deary	Simon Bailey
Hunchback	Charlie Baker
Gerrard Smalls	Billy Carter
Jordy	Victoria Elliott
Louis	Ashley Knight
Brenda	Katy Secombe
Grandpa	Joe Speare
Security Guard	Delroy Atkinson
Undertaker	Joseph Prouse
Brunhilde	Alex Young
Vladimir	Steven Serlin
Alterboyz	Shaun Smith & Rowen Hawkins
Soul Star	Scott Garnham, Gary Trainor & Jenna Boyd
The Wind	Luke Baker
Young Simons	Finlay Banks, Noah Key, Macready Massey & Milo Panni
Voiceover	Peter Dickson
