= Otherhood =

2019 American comedy film

- Official poster
- Directed by: Cindy Chupack
- Written by: Cindy Chupack; Mark Andrus
- Based on: Whatever Makes You Happy by: William Sutcliffe
- Produced by: Jason Michael Berman; Cathy Schulman
- Starring: Angela Bassett; Patricia Arquette; Felicity Huffman; Jake Hoffman; Jake Lacy; Sinqua Walls; Heidi Gardner; Stephen Kunken; Damian Young; Afton Williamson; Becki Newton; Frank De Julio; Mario Cantone; Tim Bagley; Molly Bernard; Emily Tremaine
- Cinematography: Declan Quinn
- Edited by: Sunny Hodge; Kevin Tent
- Music by: Marcelo Zarvos
- Production companies: Mandalay Pictures; Welle Entertainment
- Distributed by: Netflix
- Release dates: July 21, 2019 (51Fest); August 2, 2019 (United States)
- Running time: 100 minutes
- Country: United States
- Language: English

Otherhood is a 2019 American comedy film, directed by Cindy Chupack, from a screenplay by Chupack and Mark Andrus. It is based upon the 2008 novel Whatever Makes You Happy by William Sutcliffe and follows three suburban mothers who show up at their sons' New York City homes unannounced. It stars Angela Bassett, Patricia Arquette, Felicity Huffman, Jake Hoffman, Jake Lacy, and Sinqua Walls.

The film had its world premiere at 51Fest on July 21, 2019. It was released on August 2, 2019, by Netflix. The film received generally mixed to negative reviews, although Huffman's performance was critically praised.

== Plot ==
Daniel Lieberman, Paul Halston-Myers, and Matt Walker grew up together. Now, living in NYC, they ride with Daniel on his way to propose to Erin. Using his key to enter, he comes across a naked man at his fridge and she comes out of the bedroom mostly naked, surprised to see him.

In Poughkeepsie, NY, Carol Walker, Gillian Lieberman, and Helen Halston meet every Mother's Day to commiserate their sons not recognising the day and shutting them out. Gillian mentions swooping in on them but then takes it back. Helen motivates them all to do a road trip to surprise them.

Carol immediately starts tidying up Matt's apartment. Helen loses her nerve and books a hotel room. Gillian tries at Daniel's and gets a room as he doesn't answer. Both Carol and Gillian call to report their progress, but Helen lies that she is staying with Paul. The next morning, Helen shows up at Paul's. When she introduces herself to his other gay roommates, she complains he never came out to her, although she always knew. Gillian also sees Daniel but is visibly resentful of the surprise.

The moms meet up to compare notes. Their talk motivates Helen to move out of the hotel. That night as she preps a meal for Paul's housemates, his boyfriend tells her a lot of his insecurity comes from abandonment issues as, after her divorce, she never had time for him. When Gillian returns to Daniel's he's out, so she enters through an improperly closed window. He's gone out with Alison, a divorced Jewish woman whose number Gillian gave him. He cuts the date short as she triggers his memory of his recent breakup.

At dinner at Paul's, when Helen shares that he'd never come out to her, he says he had with his father years ago, and she gets upset. Once alone, he apologizes, but she gets upset all over again when mentioning his boyfriend's theory that his abandonment issues are because of her. Matt tells Carol he has a work party that night for his magazine, of which he is the art director.

Although not invited, they give Carol a makeover in Erin's salon. Gillian apologizes for having been hard on her. They accompany Helen to the restaurant where she is to have lunch with Paul, and he reveals he was a sperm donor for lesbian friends. Upsetting her again, Gillian and Carol witness it.

Carol crashes Matt's work party while Helen and Gillian plan to go clubbing. She gets drunk with Julia and when he sees her he tries to get her to go home. Instead, she calls the girls to go out. They live it up, getting pizza, going clubbing, and dancing all night.

In the morning, Julia stops by Matt's to leave something of Carol's. When he realises she hasn't returned, he gathers Paul and Daniel and they find their three moms, nursing hangovers in Gillian's hotel room. Afterwards, the three go together to get presents for Paul's sperm baby. In the shop, the truth comes out that all three of their husbands cheated on the same weekend. Helen divorced hers, Gillian forgave hers and Carol didn't know about it.

Then each mama gets closure with her son. Carol tells Matt she is going to focus on herself for a while. Helen pushes Paul into giving her an address, so she coerces one of the mothers to hold the baby. Gillian apologizes to Daniel about Erin, tells him how she'd forgiven his dad for infidelity, and convinces him to go after Erin.

Julia helps Matt to write the 10 things he knows about Carol, which he sends to her with a bouquet of her favorite flowers. She angrily throws out her deceased husband's fishing paraphernalia. Daniel catches Erin's moving van, offering to drive her to LA.

One year later at Gillian's house in Poughkeepsie, before Daniel and a pregnant Erin tie the knot, Carol comes. She's with Matt who is dating Julia, on return from time in Europe after selling her house. Paul is also present with his boyfriend, the lesbian mothers who got his sperm, and their daughter, Helen's granddaughter.

== Cast ==
- Angela Bassett as Carol Walker
- Patricia Arquette as Gillian Lieberman
- Felicity Huffman as Helen Halston
- Jake Hoffman as Daniel Lieberman
- Jake Lacy as Paul Halston-Myers
- Sinqua Walls as Matt Walker
- Heidi Gardner as Erin
- Stephen Kunken as Joel Lieberman
- Damian Young as Frank
- Afton Williamson as Julia
- Frank De Julio as Andre
- Becki Newton as Andrea
- Mario Cantone as Calvin
- Tim Bagley as Miles
- Molly Bernard as Alison
- Emily Tremaine as Lauren Lieberman
- Elizabeth Cappuccino as Angel

== Production ==
In April 2018, Patricia Arquette and Angela Bassett joined the cast of the film, with Cindy Chupack directing the film, from a screenplay written by Chupack and Mark Andrus, based upon the novel Whatever Makes You Happy by William Sutcliffe. Jason Michael Berman and Cathy Schulman will produce the film, under their Mandalay Pictures and Welles Entertainment banners, respectively. Arquette and Bassett will executive produce the film. Netflix will distribute. In May 2018, Sinqua Walls joined the cast of the film. In June 2018, Felicity Huffman, Jake Lacy and Jake Hoffman joined the cast.

=== Filming ===
Principal photography began on June 11, 2018, in New York City.

== Release ==
It had its world premiere at 51Fest on July 21, 2019. The film was originally scheduled to have been released on April 26, 2019. However, because of Felicity Huffman's involvement in the 2019 college admissions bribery scandal, the release date was postponed to August 2, 2019. On October 17, 2019, Netflix announced that the film had been viewed by over 29 million viewers after its release on their platform.

== Reception ==
On review aggregator website Rotten Tomatoes, the film holds an approval rating of 26% based on 27 reviews, and an average rating of 4/10. The site's critical consensus reads, "Otherhood wastes its three talented leading actresses on a forgettable dramedy about motherhood that lacks humor and feels forced." On Metacritic, the film has a weighted average score of 38 out of 100, based on 6 critics, indicating "generally unfavorable reviews".
