= The Johnny and Inel Show =

- Genre: Comedy; Sketch Comedy
- Created by: Johnny Cochrane; Inel Tomlinson; Rebecca Papworth
- Written by: Johnny Cochrane; Inel Tomlinson; Rebecca Papworth
- Directed by: David Sant; Simon Gibney
- Starring: Inel Tomlinson; Johnny Cochrane; Brennan Reece; Jo Enright; Mo Gilligan; Gayle Newbolt; Archie Kelly; Natalie Davies; Amy Louise Henry; Flo Wilson
- Country of origin: United Kingdom
- No. of seasons: 2
- No. of episodes: 26

Production
- Executive producers: Rebecca Papworth; Melissa Hardinge; Kez Margrie
- Production company: Princess Productions

Original release
- Network: CBBC
- Release: 15 January 2013 – 23 March 2014

The Johnny and Inel Show is a British entertainment series aired on the CBBC Channel from 15 January 2013. It is presented by Johnny Cochrane and Inel Tomlinson. It features numerous comedy sketches, as well as a celebrity studio guests. The studio action is filmed at MediaCityUK. Each episode usually begins with a 'Greet of the week'.

Sketches include the adventures of comic book style Wasteman, his sidekick Bear Man, accompanied by Barry the toy bear and their nemesis Omar Daze, reporter Liam Piam, cheeky schoolgirl Blondie and Johnny Kyle who interviews a different fairytale character each week. Also two J&I news correspondents Borris Horace and Noris Gloris.

== Cast and characters ==
Cast	Character	Duration
Inel Tomlinson	Various	Series 1 and 2
Johnny Cochrane	Various	Series 1 and 2
Brennan Reece	Brennan	Series 1
Jo Enright	Dinah	Series 2
Mo Gilligan	Runner	Series 2
Gayle Newbolt	Gayle	Series 2
Archie Kelly	Announcer	Series 2
Natalie Davies	Michelle	Series 2
Amy Louise Henry	Ruby	Series 2
Flo Wilson	Denise	Series 2

== Episodes ==
The first series consisted of 13 episodes, running from 15 January 2013 to 9 April 2013. The second series also consisted of 13 episodes and ran from 24 February 2014 to 23 March 2014.

== Awards and nominations ==
The show was nominated for 2 RTS NW Awards in 2013.

Best Comedy Programme - The Johnny & Inel Show
Best Performance in a Comedy - Johnny Cochrane & Inel Tomlinson
