= Wolfboy =

Musical with music and lyrics by Leon Parris and book by Russell Labey

- Poster
- Music: Leon Parris
- Lyrics: Leon Parris
- Book: Russell Labey
- Basis: play by Brad Fraser
- Productions: 2009 Edinburgh Fringe Festival; 2010 London Trafalgar Studios

Wolfboy is a musical with music and lyrics by Leon Parris and book by Russell Labey, based on the play by Brad Fraser. Its story concerns two teenagers committed to an asylum: Bernie has tried to commit suicide and David believes he is a werewolf. The musical addresses psychiatric disorders, abuse, sexuality and loneliness. The original play was staged in Canada; a 1984 production is reported as Keanu Reeves' first stage role.

The musical premiered at the Edinburgh Fringe Festival in August 2009, and had a 2010 off-West End staging at Trafalgar Studios, in London.

== Productions ==
The musical was previewed between 1 and 4 July 2009, at Tabard Theatre in Chiswick and had a run in 2009 at the Edinburgh Fringe Festival, featuring Gregg Lowe as Bernie, Paul Holowaty as David and Lee Latchford-Evans from Steps.

In 2010 it was presented at Trafalgar Studios in London, featuring Gregg Lowe as Bernie, Paul Holowaty as David, Daniel Boys as Christian, Emma Rigby as Nurse Cherry and Annabel Howitt as Annie. This staging of Wolfboy was produced from 6 to 31 July 2010, directed by Russell Labey, with Iain Vince Gatt as musical director.

== Synopsis ==
Hockey team captain and golden boy Bernie wakes up at an asylum, after trying to commit suicide. Around him, big brother Christian tries to understand what drove him to this unexpected action, nurse Cherry goes about her job and next door neighbour David is tied down under a diagnosis of lycanthropy. The ensuing days see both boys exchanging stories and growing closer, with pasts of abuse, hustling and neglect emerging.

== Musical numbers ==
Note: The song titles are not listed in the programme and the CD release contains only 4 tracks

- 1. "The Visit"
- 2. "One Wall Away from Your Dreams"
- 3. "1 Seven, 2 Jacks & an Ace"
- 4. "Come Home"

== Casting ==
=== London cast ===
- Bernie: Gregg Lowe
- David: Paul Holowaty
- Christian: Daniel Boys
- Cherry: Emma Rigby
- Annie: Annabel Howitt
