= Sarah Earnshaw =

British actress

- Born: 26 December 1983 (age 42); Leeds
- Education: Mountview Academy of Theatre Arts
- Occupations: Actress, singer
- Known for: Appearing in the Original London Cast of Wicked
- Website: www.sarah-earnshaw.com

Sarah Earnshaw (born 26 December 1983) is a British actress known for her work in musical theatre.

== Early life ==
Born in Leeds in 1983, Earnshaw moved to London in 2000 to train at Mountview Academy of Arts in London, graduating in 2003 with a first class BA in Musical Theatre.

== Theatre credits and career ==
Earnshaw made her West End debut in the Original London Cast of Wicked, at the Apollo Victoria Theatre, as a Glinda / Nessarose understudy. The show officially opened on 27 September 2006, after previews from 7 September. She later became the Glinda standby in 2007. She left the company on 8 January 2011, with Rachel Tucker as Elphaba and Louise Dearman as Glinda.

In 2013, Earnshaw played Lady of the Lake in Spamalot at The Playhouse Theatre in the West End and Audrey in Little Shop of Horrors at Aberystwyth Arts Centre. She created the role of Sam in Payback (at the Riverside Studios) in June 2013, opposite Matthew White, and Christmas 2013 saw Earnshaw appear as Fairy in Jack and the Beanstalk at Sheffield Lyceum. In 2011, she took the role of Emma Carew in Jekyll & Hyde on the 2nd U.K. Tour opposite Marti Pellow as Jekyll/Hyde. In 2012, she played 'The Ghost of Christmas Past' in Scrooge at the London Palladium, reprising the role she had previously played on the UK Tour of the musical opposite Tommy Steele.

=== Other notable credits ===
Other works she has appeared in include; Alice In Wonderland (West Yorkshire Playhouse), After The Turn (Courtyard Theatre) and The Royal Variety Performance (London Coliseum). She has appeared in workshops for The Secret Diary of Adrian Mole, Aged 13¾ written by Jake Brunger and Pippa Cleary, Dusty as young Dusty Springfield at the Duchess Theatre, London and Only The Brave at the Arts Theatre, London, Travels With My Aunt for Chichester and as Bella Spellgrove in Sherlock Holmes.

In 2014 Sarah appeared in the original cast of The A-Z of Mrs P at Southwark Playhouse produced by Michael Peavoy and The Booking Office and directed by Sam Buntrock. She then followed this with a guest lead in Casualty playing the role of Maggie. and appeared in an advert for Go Compare In 2015 she appears again as Lady of the Lake in Spamalot on UK Tour, the tour opened in Manchester on 19 January 2015.

She appeared in Travels With My Aunt (Minerva, Chichester) and as Kate in the one woman show Heart Of Winter.

In May 2017. she was cast as Jennifer Lore (main lead) in Nativity! The Musical at Birmingham Repertory Theatre.

She played Betty Spencer in the 2018 stage adaptation of Some Mothers Do ‘Ave ‘Em on UK Tour, followed by playing Connie in The Nightingales for Theatre Royal Bath and on UK tour, Jane in The Argument again at Theatre Royal Bath and Claire Sutton in Yes Prime Minister at Theatre Clwyd.

Later, she played the role of Tanya in the 2023 UK and International tour of Mamma Mia! After extending her contract at Mamma Mia! multiple times, Earnshaw left the production in June 2025. It was announced on 15 September 2025, that Sarah would reprise her role of Tanya on another UK Only Tour. This time, playing from 24 October 2025 - 2 August 2026.

== Recordings ==
Sarah is featured on the following musical theatre albums: Unwritten Songs (Spekulation Entertainment), Acoustic Overtures (Sim G Records) The Music Box (Escape Records) and The Nativity! The Musical Original Cast Recording (Jamie Wilson Productions / Nativity! Theatre Ltd)

== Concert work ==
Earnshaw has appeared in concerts for The Mercury Music 20th Anniversary Gala at the Novello Theatre where she sang "Portrait of a Princess" written by Michael Bruce. She sang "Again" in the Divas Sing Scott Alan concert at the Arts Theatre, A Little Less Ordinary (Apollo), 80th Birthday Gala (Apollo Victoria) and West End Stars In Concert (Ireland). In November 2013 she appeared in concert with John Owen-Jones in Stars on Parade at Glasgow Concert Hall
