= Daniel Boys =

British actor and singer

- Born: 26 March 1979 (age 47); Yateley, Hampshire, England
- Education: Guildford School of Acting
- Occupations: Actor; singer; recording artist; reality TV star
- Partner: Chris Jenkins

Daniel Boys (born 26 March 1979) is an English actor. He starred in the West End productions of the musicals Rent and Grease before being a 2007 contestant on the BBC talent series Any Dream Will Do. Boys went on to star in many more musicals including Avenue Q, Spamalot, Falsettos and Hamilton.

== Early life and education ==
Boys was born in Yateley, Hampshire, the son of a chartered surveyor and a phlebotomist. He won a Cameron Mackintosh scholarship to study at the Guildford School of Acting, where he graduated with a BA (Honours) in 2001.

== Career ==
Boys was selected to perform in the first UK tour of Jonathan Larson's Rent, which meant leaving college early. He understudied the characters of Mark (played by Adam Rickitt) and Angel, eventually taking over the role of Mark, performing on alternate nights at the Prince of Wales Theatre in London's West End. In 2002, he played Morino in the UK tour of Sunset Boulevard, which starred Faith Brown. Boys also appeared as Roger, one of the T-birds, in Grease at the Victoria Palace. He also went on the touring production to Japan, and playing the role of Doody in Scandinavia and Cyprus. Daniel was also a soloist in Disney's Enchanted Evening (a series of UK concerts in 2004), of which the final concert was televised on BBC1 as the BBC Family Prom in the Park.

In 2005, Boys took part in BBC London's Children in Need – The Musical. He also performed at Party in the Park with the company of Grease. Guest TV appearances with Grease also included Blue Peter and The Graham Norton Show. His other early theatre credits include; Austin in I Love You Because (Landor in 2007), Anthony in Sweeney Todd (Royal Festival Hall in 2007), Mark in Rent (European Tour in 2006) and Parson Nathaniel (u/s) in Jeff Wayne's The War of the Worlds (National Tour in 2007). He also understudied all male roles. He can be seen on the live tour DVD special features, performing in place of Russell Watson in the dress rehearsal.

=== Any Dream Will Do ===
In 2007, he participated in the BBC reality show Any Dream Will Do. On 19 May he was the 7th contestant to be eliminated from the series. During the series, the judges tested his vocal skills on a wide variety of music genres including rock, swing, ballads, and pop. His only opportunity to sing a musical theatre number was during a sing-off, in which he performed "Bring Him Home" from Les Misérables against Lewis Bradley. Daniel received the fewest votes, and was chosen to leave the show by Andrew Lloyd Webber.

=== Career After Any Dream Will Do ===
In July 2007, Boys then appeared as Anthony Hope in Stephen Sondheim's Sweeney Todd: The Demon Barber of Fleet Street which was one of the first shows to open at the newly restored Royal Festival Hall.

In late 2008, Daniel joined the cast of the hit show Avenue Q. For over two years, Daniel played the lead roles of Princeton and Rod. He won the "What's on Stage Theatregoers Choice Award" for "Best Takeover in a Role" for his performance. On 14 September 2008, Boys performed at Andrew Lloyd Webber's 60th birthday concert in Hyde Park, singing "A Light at the End of the Tunnel" alongside other finalists from the TV series "Any Dream will Do" and "I'd Do Anything". The concert was later broadcast by the BBC on Radio 2.

He also appeared on the BBC programme "Songs of Praise" on 11 January 2009, performing the song "You Know Better than I" from the animated musical Joseph – King of Dreams. Later in 2009, he toured with John Barrowman on his Music Music Music tour, singing some solo material from his debut album and a duet with Barrowman, "I Know Him So Well". On 6 December 2009, Boys performed with fellow artists in "Christmas in New York" at the Prince of Wales Theatre. Among his songs were "Ave Maria" and "Winter Wonderland". In 2009 Daniel's debut solo album So Close was released. To coincide with the release, Daniel embarked on a series of solo concerts performing at venues such as Leicester Square Theatre, the Delfont Room in the Prince of Wales Theatre, Wilton Music Hall, Greenwich Theatre and three sold-out performances at Pizza on the Park (Jazz Club), London. He made his American debut with the show when he performed at Show at Barre (Los Angeles), supported by Broadway actress Megan Hilty, and in Australia he played at both Sydney and the Adelaide Cabaret Festival alongside acts such as Olivia Newton-John and Chita Rivera.

In February 2010, Boys performed with Jessie Buckley in two concerts in Manchester and Birmingham entitled "Valentines at the Musicals" including songs from West Side Story and My Fair Lady. He then performed as Eddie in the workshop production of Painted Lady: The Princess Caraboo Scandal (Bristol Old Vic/Finborough), then as Christian in the London premiere of Wolfboy at Trafalgar Studios.

In 2011, he was Jason in Ordinary Days (Trafalgar Studios), and as Doug in the workshop of The Trouble with Doug (Northampton Royal & Derngate). In July, he performed the title role in a new musical version of Peter Pan, first playing at the Grand Canal Theatre, Dublin over the summer and then at the Mayflower Theatre, Southampton, for the Christmas period. On 21 October 2011, Boys played Judas in the 40th anniversary production of Godspell alongside Kerry Ellis at the Palace Theatre, Manchester.

On 6 May 2012, he was one of the headline performers in "The Night of 1000 Voices" at the Royal Albert Hall. and then completed a run as Algernon in a new musical version of The Importance of Being Earnest at the Theatre Royal, Windsor. In September 2012 he was a guest on Radio 2's Friday Night is Music Night which was recorded live at LSO St Lukes, London. He made a short film with David Paisley entitled Fall-Out about two ex-partners who end up in a fallout shelter together, which went round the 2012 festival circuit.

In February 2013, Network Ten and FremantleMedia Australia announced that they were searching across Australia and the United Kingdom for a singer to record a new version of the theme tune for Neighbours The competition resulted in a tie and the new theme is sung as a duet by Daniel and Stephanie Angelini. The new version of the theme tune began airing from 15 April 2013. In July 2013 he joined High Society UK touring cast, playing Mike Connor.

In March 2014, Boys joined the West End production of Spamalot at the Playhouse Theatre as Sir Lancelot. He also appeared in West End Recast, a one-off concert at the Duke of York's Theatre.

On 31 March 2015, he appeared on Holby City on BBC 1 as Josh Harrison.

In January 2016, it was announced he will appear in the new musical comedy Miss Atomic Bomb in the St James's Theatre alongside TV and theatre star Catherine Tate. In October 2016 he starred as Donald in a production of The Boys in the Band, by Mart Crowley at the Park Theatre, with co-stars including Mark Gatiss, James Holmes, Ben Mansfield and Jack Derges.

In May 2017, he was cast as teacher Paul Maddens in Nativity! The Musical at Birmingham Repertory Theatre. Boys later played another teacher, Mr. Johnson, in the fourth film in the Nativity series, Nativity Rocks! in 2018. In August 2017 Boys starred alongside Helena Blackman and Sherman Brothers' musical scion, composer Robert J. Sherman in A Spoonful of Sherman at "Live At Zedel" in London.

At the beginning of 2018, Boys performed for two months in the Theatre Clwyd production of Little Shop of Horrors, starring as Seymour. After starring in Nativity Rocks!, Boys appeared in the World Premiere of Love Story at the Bolton Octagon, starring as Dan.

He was cast as Joseph Kirby in ITV's Endeavour in January 2019. In May 2019 it was announced that Boys would lead the UK Premiere cast of Falsettos at The Other Palace in London's Off-West End. He played the role of Marvin until the show closed in January 2020.

Boys performed in a concert performance of Alain Boublil & Claude-Michel Schönberg's The Pirate Queen on 23 February 2020 at the London Coliseum in aid of Leukaemia UK.

From November 2023, Boys starred as King George III in the United Kingdom and Ireland tour of Lin-Manuel Miranda's musical Hamilton before taking on the same role in the London production of Hamilton at the Victoria Palace.

== Recordings ==
In 2008, Boys recorded a song for the CD Act One – Songs From The Musicals Of Alexander S. Bermange, an album of 20 brand new recordings by 26 West End stars, released in October 2008 on Dress Circle Records.

His debut album So Close launched on 1 June 2009. It was mixed by Grammy award-winner (and cousin) Jerry Boys in early 2009. The penultimate track Always There features the backing vocals of friends and cast members from Avenue Q.

Boys also recorded the song My Brother's Eyes on Terry Pratchett's Only You Can Save Mankind, which was released on 23 November 2009, and recorded a version of I Know Him So Well with John Barrowman for his 2008 album Music Music Music.

In 2011 he recorded a charity single with proceeds going to the Disney Appeal at Great Ormond Street Hospital, called The World is Something You Can Imagine. Boys also appeared on the cast recording of Wolfboy, More With Every Line – the Songs of Tim Prottey-Jones, Only You Can Save Mankind, The Inbetween: A New Musical (in 2012) and Christmas in New York. He has also contributed to Helena Blackman's debut album.

On 6. November 2018 AGR Television Records announced that Boys had signed a multi-album record deal with them. The first release under the new contract was Christmas Lullaby later the same month. An album was announced for 2019.

== Film and theatre ==
=== Filmography ===
Year	Title	Role	Notes
2006	The Graham Norton Show	Himself	Performing with the company of Grease
2007	Any Dream Will Do	Himself	
2009	Songs of Praise	Himself	
2012	Fall-Out	Partner 1	Short-Film
2012	Little Man	Elliot	Short-Film
2015	Holby City	Josh Harrison	
2018	Nativity Rocks!	Mr Johnson	
2019	Endeavor	Joseph Kirby	

=== Theatre credits ===
Year	Title	Role	Theatre	Location
2001	Rent	Ensemble / Understudy Mark & Angel	—N/a	UK National Tour
2002	Rent	Mark	Prince of Wales Theatre	West End
2002-03	Sunset Boulevard	Morino	—N/a	UK National Tour
2003	Grease	Roger	Victoria Palace	West End
2004	Grease	Doody	—N/a	Japan National Tour
2006	Rent	Mark	—N/a	European Tour
2007	I Love You Because	Austin	Landor Theatre	London
2007	Sweeney Todd: The Demon Barber of Fleet Street	Anthony	Royal Festival Hall	London
2007	The War of the Worlds: Farewell Thunderchild	Understudy Parson Nathaniel	—N/a	UK National Tour
2008-10	Avenue Q	Princeton & Rod	Noël Coward Theatre	West End
2009	John Barrowman's Music Music Music Tour	Himself	—N/a	UK National Tour
2010	Valentine's at the Musicals	Himself	Manchester / Birmingham	Tour
2010	Painted Lady: The Princess Caraboo Scandel	Eddie	Bristol Old Vic	Bristol
2010	Wolfboy	Christian	Trafalgar Studios	West End
2011	Ordinary Days	Jason	Trafalgar Studios	West End
2011	The Trouble with Doug	Doug	Royal & Derngate	Northampton
2011	Peter Pan	Peter Pan	Grand Canal Theatre	Dublin
2011	Godspell	Judas	Palace Theatre, Manchester	Manchester
2012	The Night of 1000 Voices	Himself	Royal Albert Hall	London
2012-13	The Who's Tommy	Tommy	Prince Edward Theatre	West End
2013	High Society	Mike Connor	—N/a	UK National Tour
2014	Love Story	Oliver Barrett IV	Octagon Theatre	Bolton
2014-15	Spamalot	Sir Lancelot	Playhouse Theatre	West End
2015	West End Recast	Himself	Duke of York's Theatre	West End
2016	Miss Atomic Bomb		St James's Theatre	West End
2016	The Boys in the Band	Donald	Park Theatre	Off-West End
2017	Nativity! The Musical	Paul Maddens	Birmingham Repertory Theatre	Birmingham
2017	A Spoonful of Sherman	Himself	—N/a	UK National Tour
2018	Little Shop of Horrors	Seymour	Theatre Clwyd	Wales
2018	Love Story	Dan	Bolton Octagon	Bolton
2019	Falsettos	Marvin	The Other Palace	Off-West End
2020	The Pirate Queen	Bingham	London Coliseum	West End
2021	Treason	King James	Cadogan Hall	London
2021	Leonard Bernstein's New York	Lead Vocalist	Waterloo East	London
2021-22	Jack & The Beanstalk	Fleshcreep	Milton Keynes Theatre	Milton Keynes
2022	Treason	King James	Theatre Royal Drury Lane	West End
2023–24	Hamilton	King George III	-	UK & Ireland tour
2025–26	Hamilton	King George III	Victoria Palace Theatre	West End

== Discography ==
- So Close (2009)

== Personal life ==
He has revealed in several interviews that he is gay. He said

I think it's very sad that people have to live a lie and I'd never want to do that. It must be horrific for them.

He has been in a relationship with Welsh actor Chris Jenkins since 2014.
