= New Boy (novel) =

1996 novel by William Sutcliffe

- First edition
- Author: William Sutcliffe
- Language: English
- Genre: Coming-of-age; Gay romance
- Set in: Hertfordshire, England (1986)
- Publisher: Penguin Books
- Publication date: 1996
- Publication place: United Kingdom
- Media type: Print
- Pages: 199
- ISBN: 0-14-025593-1
- OCLC: 35359806

New Boy is a novel, published in 1996, written by British novelist William Sutcliffe.

The book is largely autobiographical, mixing fact and fiction. It tells the story of the arrival of a new boy, Barry, in the sixth form of an English private school.

The school is never named in the novel, but a host of clues (most tellingly the school motto) reveals the school to be Sutcliffe's alma mater, Haberdashers' Aske's Boys' School, a fact that was picked up at the time by the British broadsheet press.

== Plot summary ==
The book is set in 1986 and is narrated by a Jewish student at the school, Mark, who does not have much success with girls. He finds himself drawn to Barry, who is incredibly handsome. The two become friends, and the book tells of the course of just over a year during which Barry discovers sex with girls and has an affair with a teacher. Mark struggles with his attraction to Barry, but has a relationship with Barry's sister, Louise. Barry, meanwhile, realises that he is, in fact, gay, and enters into a relationship with Mark's brother, Dan, which Mark is unaware of. The four all go on holiday together, and Dan and Barry tell Mark of their relationship. He reacts badly, and accuses them of not being normal. This leads to Barry storming off and Louise dumping Mark. Mark and Barry do have a rapprochement of sorts at the end of the book, but their friendship is over. Mark ends the book contending that he can't be homophobic, because he made it up with his brother.

== Adaptations ==
The book was adapted for the stage by Russell Labey, and performed at the 2000 Edinburgh Festival Fringe. It staged a major revival in April 2008 at the Tabard Theatre which subsequently led to a West End production at the Trafalgar Studios in London in March and April 2009, starring Nicholas Hoult as Mark. It is currently running at the Newspace Theatre in Cape Town, South Africa directed by British director Russell Labey and starring Stephen Jubber as Barry.
