= Nativity! The Musical =

2017 stage musical written and directed by Debbie Isitt

Nativity!
- The Musical
- Official artwork
- Music: Debbie Isitt; Nicky Ager
- Lyrics: Debbie Isitt; Nicky Ager
- Book: Debbie Isitt
- Basis: Nativity! 2009 film by Debbie Isitt
- Premiere: 20 October 2017: Birmingham Repertory Theatre
- Productions: 2017 UK tour and London; 2018 UK tour and London; 2019 UK tour and London; 2022 Birmingham revival

Nativity! The Musical is a stage musical written and directed by Debbie Isitt (co-composed by Nicky Ager), based on Isitt's 2009 film of the same name (part of the Nativity film series).

The musical follows a Coventry based primary school, St Bernadette's, where teacher Mr Maddens and his assistant, Mr Poppy mount a musical version of the nativity with the students, promising it will be adapted into a Hollywood movie. The musical features songs from the film including "Sparkle and Shine", "Nazareth", "One Night One Moment" and "She's The Brightest Star".

== Production history ==
=== Birmingham, UK tour and London (2017) ===
The musical made its world premiere at the Birmingham Repertory Theatre from 20 October to 12 November 2017, before touring to Southend Cliffs Pavilion (15 to 19 November), Sheffield Lyceum Theatre (22 to 26 November), Manchester Palace Theatre (29 November to 3 December), Plymouth Theatre Royal (6 to 10 December), London's Eventim Apollo (13 to 17 December) and Leeds Grand Theatre (20 December to 6 January 2018)

The production was directed by Isitt, choreographed by Andrew Wright, with musical arrangements, supervision and orchestrations by George Dyer, designed by David Woodhead. The cast included Daniel Boys as Mr Maddens, Sarah Earnshaw as Jennifer Lore and Simon Lipkin as Mr Poppy. The X Factor judge Louis Walsh appeared as Hollywood Producer during the production's run at London's Eventim Apollo.

=== UK tour and London (2018) ===
A second tour in the United Kingdom began at the Belgrade Theatre in Coventry (the city where the story is set and the film was shot) from 23 to 28 October 2018. Further tour dates included Liverpool Empire (31 October to 4 November), King's Theatre Glasgow (7 to 11 November), Milton Keynes Theatre (14 to 18 November), Nottingham Theatre Royal (21 to 25 November), Edinburgh Festival Theatre (28 November to 2 December), Regent Theatre Stoke-on-Trent (5 to 8 December) Oxford New Theatre (12 to 15 December) and returning to London's Eventim Apollo (19 to 31 December).

Simon Lipkin reprised his role as Mr Poppy, alongside many other members of the original cast. Scott Garnham and Ashleigh Gray were announced to play Mr Maddens and Jennifer Lore. The role of the Hollywood Producer featured many celebrity star guest appearances at each location on the tour including Jake Wood appeared in Oxford, Adam Thomas in Stoke and Liverpool, Charlie Brooks in Nottingham, Jane McCarry in Glasgow and Danny Dyer in London. Jo Brand also appeared as The Critic in Edinburgh and London also Dani Dyer appeared during the London dates with her father Danny Dyer as Polly Parker, the daughter of the Hollywood Producer who is an aspiring Hollywood actress.

=== UK tour and London (2019) ===
The musical toured the United Kingdom once again, beginning at the Wolverhampton Grand Theatre from 29 October to 2 November 2019 before touring to Aylesbury Waterside Theatre (6 to 9 November), Canterbury Marlowe Theatre (13 to 17 November), Wales Millennium Centre, Cardiff (19 to 23 November), Plymouth Theatre Royal (26 to 30 November) and Southampton Mayflower Theatre (3 to 7 December) before returning for a third season to London's Eventim Apollo (11 to 29 December).

Scott Paige played Mr Poppy for the tour opposite Scott Garnham and Ashleigh Gray who returned as Mr Maddens and Jennifer Lore, alongside Danni Dyer as Polly Parker who appeared for the tour. Simon Lipkin reprised his role as Mr Poppy for the London run (and stepped in to cover the role during the Southampton run for Paige due to illness) while Paige played Mr Rye. The London run also featured Rylan Clark-Neal as The Critic, Sharon Osbourne as Crystal Collins and Danny Dyer returning as the Hollywood Producer.

=== Birmingham revival (2022) ===
The musical was announced to return to the Birmingham Repertory Theatre for the Christmas 2020 season. However, due to the COVID-19 pandemic, the run was postponed to the Christmas 2021 season, before being postponed again to Christmas 2022, when it ran from 19 November 2022 to 7 January 2023 starring Ben Lancaster as Mr. Poppy and Billy Roberts as Mr. Maddens alongside Daisy Steere as Jennifer. This production also saw the return of Jemma Churchill as Mrs. Bevan who, after appearing in the original and 2018 productions, made a return as she took a year off from the show in 2019.

=== Amateur Productions ===
Since the original 2017 production, the rights to perform Nativity! in both professional and amateur settings have been available through Music Theatre International in arrangement with publishers Josef Weinberger Ltd. The show has become a regular fixture over the festive period for amateur performance groups throughout the United Kingdom.

== Cast and characters ==
Character	UK tour and London			Birmingham
Character	2017	2018	2019	2022
Mr Poppy	Simon Lipkin	Simon Lipkin	Scott Paige Simon Lipkin	Ben Lancaster
Paul Maddens	Daniel Boys	Scott Garnham	Scott Garnham	Billy Roberts
Jennifer Lore	Sarah Earnshaw	Ashleigh Gray	Ashleigh Gray	Daisy Steere
Gordon Shakespeare	Andy Brady	Andy Brady	Charles Brunton	Matthew Rowland
Mrs Bevan	Jemma Churchill	Jemma Churchill	Penelope Woodman	Jemma Churchill
The Critic	Jamie Chapman	Jamie Chapman Jo Brand	Jamie Chapman Rylan Clark-Neal	Jamie Chapman
Hollywood Producer	Andy Barke Louis Walsh	Andy Barke Jake Wood Adam Thomas Charlie Brooks Jane McCarry Danny Dyer	Dani Dyer Dawn Buckland Danny Dyer	Cameron Johnson
Polly Parker	—N/a	Dani Dyer	Dani Dyer	—N/a
Crystal Collins	—N/a	—N/a	Sharon Osbourne	—N/a
The Lord Mayor / Ensemble	Gary Davis	Gary Davis	Jonathan Bourne	Ralph Bogard
Miss/Mr Rye / Ensemble	Katia Sartini	Oscar Conlon-Morrey	Kade Ferriaolo Scott Paige	Tom Hext
TJ's Mum	Jalisa Andrews	Helena Pipe	Helena Pipe	Eliza Waters
Ensemble	Jennifer Louise Jones	Helena Pipe	Helena Pipe; Billy Roberts; Dawn Buckland	
On Stage Swing	Derek Aidoo	Kade Ferraiolo	Connor Ewing; Kade Ferraiolo	Callum Train; Sydney Isitt-Ager; Louie Wood
On Stage Swing	Jalisa Andrews	Ashleigh Graham	Amy Oxley	

In order to accommodate a variety of star casting, various versions of Nativity! The Musical exist;

- Regular version, where the Hollywood Producer's role is minimal.
- Second version, where the Hollywood Producer's role is expanded and includes a daughter, Polly Parker.
- Third version, where the Hollywood Producer's role is filled by the character Polly Parker.
- Fourth version, where the Hollywood Producer's role is expanded and includes a daughter, Polly Parker and the role of Crystal Collins is created, the CEO of the company the Producer works for.

== Musical numbers ==
Act I

- "Overture" – Orchestra, Company and Mr Poppy
- "M.A.D.A - Here Comes Santa Claus / Going For The Big Time" – Mr Maddens, Jennifer, Mr Shakespeare and Company
- "Review" – Critic
- "Five Star Review/Better Than You" – Mr Shakespeare and Oakmoor Kids
- "St Bernadette's" – St Bernadette Kids
- "My Very First Day Of School" – Mr Poppy
- "Wrapped In A Rainbow" – Mr Maddens and Jennifer
- "Hollywood Are Coming" – Mr Poppy, Mrs Bevan, Lord Mayor, St Bernadette Kids and Company
- "Our School Nativity" – Mr Poppy, Mr Maddens and St Bernadette Kids
- "The Lord Mayor's Ball" – Mr Shakespeare, The Critic and Company
- "Dear Father Christmas" – St Bernadette Kids
- "Hollywood We're Coming/Sparkle and Shine" – St Bernadette Kids and Company

Act II

- "Ent'racte" – Orchestra
- "Welcome To Hollywood" – Jennifer and Company
- "Jennifer's Request" – Jennifer
- "Dear Father Christmas (Reprise) / My Very Last Day at School" – St Bernadette Kids and Mr Poppy
- "Herod The Rock Opera" – Mr Shakespeare and Oakmoor Kids
- "Suddenly" – Mr Maddens and Jennifer
- "Our School Nativity" (Reprise) – Mr Poppy, Mr Maddens and St Bernadette Kids
- "Nazareth" – St Bernadette Kids
- "One Look" – St Bernadette Kids
- "Good News" – St Bernadette Kids
- "Hollywood Never Came" – Mr Shakespeare (2022 production only)
- "Sparkle And Shine" – Full Company
- "She's The Brightest Star" – St Bernadette Kids
- "Suddenly" (Reprise) – Mr Maddens and Jennifer
- "One Night, One Moment" – Full Company
- "Sparkle And Shine" – Full Company
- "Bows / Exit Music" – Orchestra

=== Cast recording ===
The original cast recording was released on 29 January 2018 and features 29 tracks. It is available from Amazon, iTunes, Spotify and Apple Music, and was available to purchase from the merchandise stands during the subsequent tours.

== Critical reception ==
The production received positive reviews from local press in Birmingham, receiving five stars from Plays To See, Behind The Arras, Birmingham Mail and What's On Birmingham
