= Landor Theatre =

Pub Theatre in South London

The Landor Theatre
- The Landor
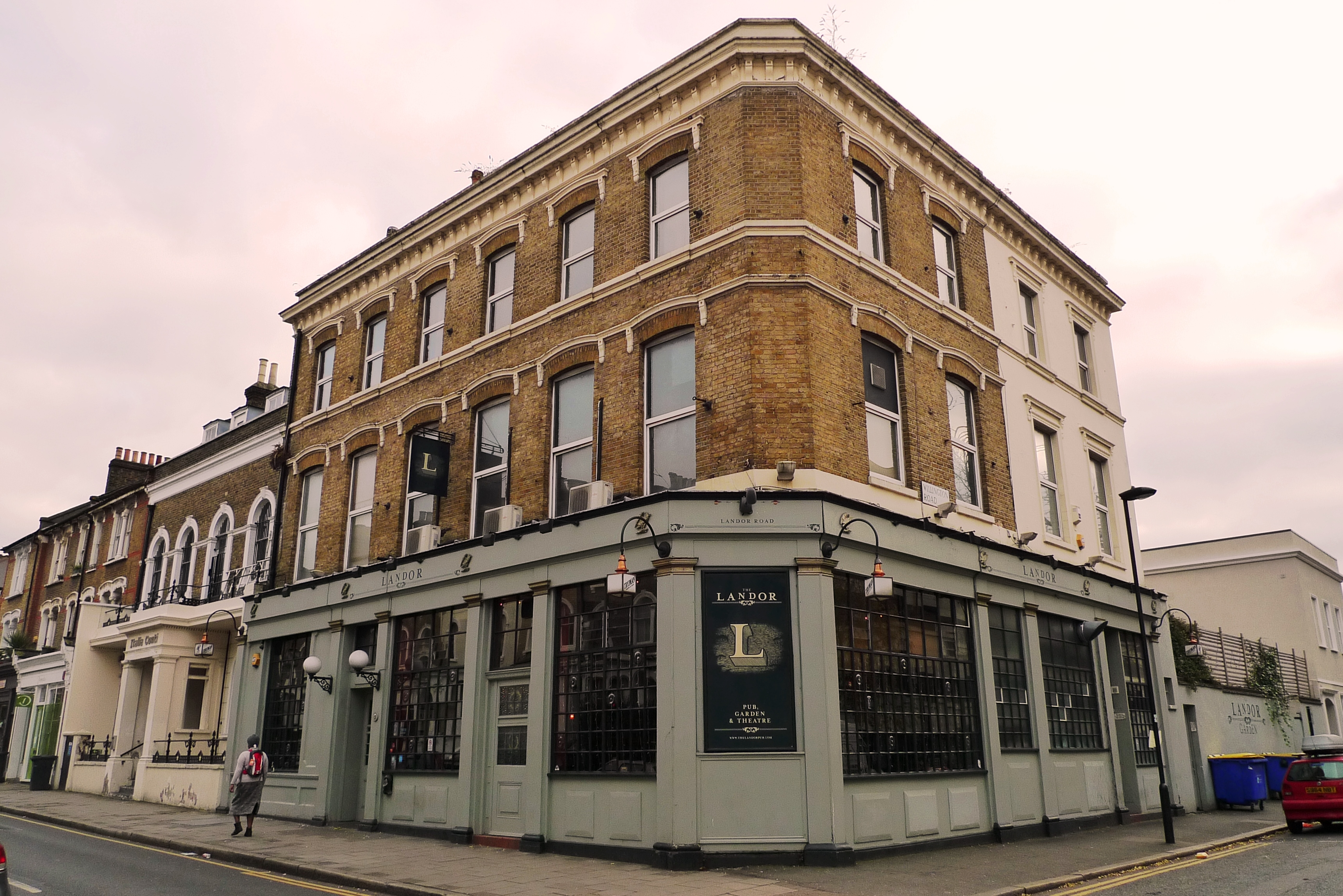
- Exterior of the Landor Theatre
- Interactive map of The Landor Theatre
- Address: Clapham, London; England
- Coordinates: 51.4657°N 0.1261°W
- Type: Theatre
- Designation: Pub theatre

Construction
- Opened: 1994
- Renovated: 1998

Website
- landorspace.com

The Landor Theatre is a pub theatre in Clapham, South London.

Originally the Cage Theatre upon its opening in 1994, the Landor became "Upstairs at the Landor" in 1995 and finally the Landor Theatre in 1998, following a refit of the building.

In 2010, the Landor staged productions of Smokey Joe's Cafe, Closer Than Ever and Tomorrow Morning. In 2013 it staged the London premiere of title of show starring Scott Garnham as Hunter.

landortheatre.co.uk
