= Tabard Theatre =

Theatre in Chiswick, London, England

Coordinates: 51.4957°N 0.2547°W

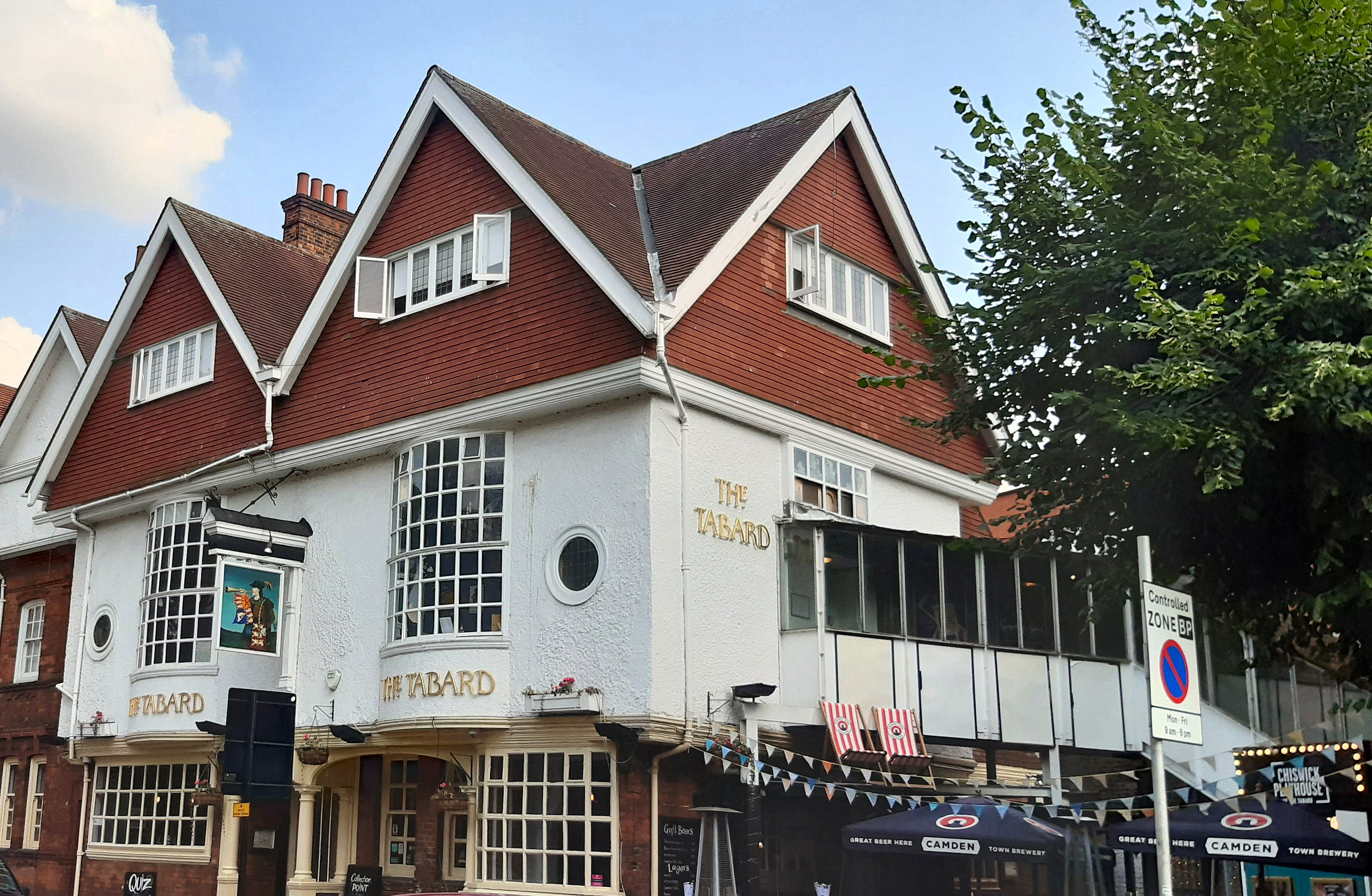
The Tabard

The Tabard Theatre is an 88-seat studio theatre in Chiswick in the London Borough of Hounslow. Close to Turnham Green Underground station, it is situated above the Tabard public house on Bath Road. The Tabard Theatre was licensed and opened for theatre use in 1985. It was renamed as the Chiswick Playhouse in 2019, but closed in March 2022. It reopened as the Tabard in September 2022.

== Building ==
The Tabard public house was built in 1880 by the architect Norman Shaw as one of the public buildings of the Bedford Park garden suburb; the others, nearby, are the Bedford Park Stores, St Michael and All Angels church, and a clubhouse, now the London Buddhist Vihara. The upper walls of the public house are covered in Arts and Craft tiles by William De Morgan, and the fireplaces have surrounds of tiles created by Walter Crane – an early example of Art Nouveau.

== History ==
=== Tabard Theatre ===
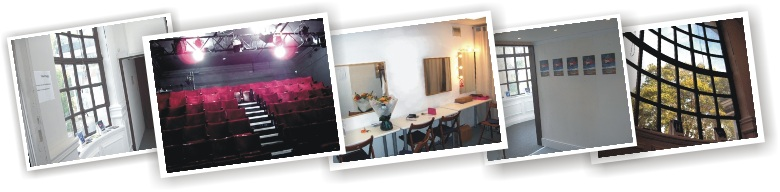
Interior

The Tabard Theatre was licensed and opened for theatre use in 1985. It was founded by the actress Andrea Black. With the help of the playwright Sam Dowling, the actor Ron Forfar and the playwright Dale Reynolds, 'The Tabard Theatre of New Writing' was established with a vision for the future of theatre through recognising new playwrights. The first play chosen was Our Blue Heaven by the late Bill Jesse, followed by Riverman by Sam Dowling. Originally, actors from West London Equity supported an event to raise money to adapt the room above the Tabard pub into a theatre. When Andrea Black took over the space, it was just a carpeted room. Hidden behind the wallpaper were original William Morris tiles.

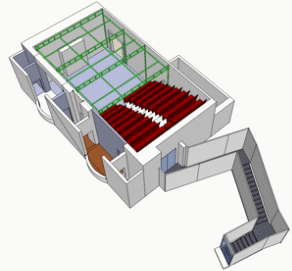
3-D model of the theatre's interior

The space was painted, a ticket office was established, and bookings were taken for the first production. News of the new theatre in West London attracted a wealth of creative like-minded people who gave much of their time to the success. Directors such as Stephen Butcher and Jay Vaughan worked on some of the early plays, chosen collectively by a creative team appointed by Andrea Black and Sam Dowling. The theatre created a strong reputation for new writing, and developed into a home for experimental theatre and alternative comedy.

In 2005 the theatre was refurbished. At the end of 2007, the Tabard Theatre started to produce in house, making it one of the few theatres to do so in a studio theatre with no central funding. In 2009, New Boy, a 2008 co-production, transferred to the West End; In 2010, Wolfboy followed its steps. In 2011, the Tabard presented You're A Good Man, Charlie Brown directed by Anthony Drewe and starring Olivier Award winning Leanne Jones. The Tabard produced the world premiere of Richard Harris's new play Liza Liza Liza about the life of Liza Minnelli. Christmas shows have included Stiles and Drewe's musicals Honk! and Just So, Rodgers and Hammerstein's Cinderella and currently the UK Premiere of Alan Menken's adaptation of A Christmas Carol. The theatre gained a reputation as a venue for comedians to try out new work prior to major tours, and well known names such as Russell Brand, Harry Hill, Russell Howard, Dara Ó Briain and Al Murray have all played there.

=== Chiswick Playhouse ===
In 2019, the theatre was renamed the Chiswick Playhouse. The actor Fred Perry became executive director of the theatre. The Chiswick Playhouse closed in March 2022.

=== Theatre at the Tabard ===
Theatre returned to the Tabard in July 2022. In 2025, the Tabard won the London Pub Theatre of the Year award, as well as prizes for two productions, The Mikado and The Snow Queen. The awards were received by the theatre's artistic director Simon Reilly and its executive director and creative producer Sarah Reilly.
