= The Lorax (musical) =

- Promotional image for production, featuring the puppet of The Lorax.
- Music: Charlie Fink
- Lyrics: Charlie Fink
- Book: David Greig
- Basis: The Lorax by Dr. Seuss
- Productions: 2015 London

The Lorax is a stage adaptation of the children's book of the same name by Dr. Seuss, adapted by David Greig and featuring songs by Charlie Fink.

The musical made its world premiere on 4 December 2015 at The Old Vic in London.

== Productions ==
=== The Old Vic, London (2015 & 17) ===
A stage adaptation of Dr. Seuss' The Lorax was scheduled for Christmas in 2015 as part of Matthew Warchus' first season as artistic director at The Old Vic. It was adapted by David Greig and directed by Max Webster.

The production began on 4 December and finished on 16 January 2016. The production's creative team also consisted of Noah and the Whale frontman Charlie Fink writing music and lyrics, Drew McOnie as choreographer, Rob Howell as designer, John Clark as lighting designer, Tom Gibbons as sound designer, Phil Bateman as musical director/arranger and Nick Barnes and Finn Caldwell as puppetry designers. The cast included Simon Lipkin as the title role of 'The Lorax' (assisted by Laura Cubitt and Ben Thompson as puppeteers) and Simon Paisley Day as 'The Once-ler'.

The production returned to The Old Vic for three weeks only from 15 October to 7 November 2017.

=== North America (2017–18) ===
The production was transferred to the Royal Alexandra Theatre in Toronto, Canada for a Christmas run from December 9 to January 21, 2018.

Following the Toronto run, the show was produced in partnership with The Old Vic and Children's Theatre Company in Minneapolis where it was performed from April 17 to June 10, 2018, before transferring to the Old Globe Theatre in San Diego from July 3 to August 12.

=== Old Vic, virtual (2021) ===
From 14 to 17 April 2021 an "inventively transformed ... semi-staged pint-size version" was streamed live from the Old Vic stage, during the UK's COVID-19 lockdown.

== Synopsis ==
=== Act I ===
On a gray street at the end of town, there is a house where the Once-ler lives. Nearby, there is a broken statue of the Lorax with the word 'unless' engraved into it ("Life is Tough"). A kid wants to find out more about the Lorax. After being paid, the Once-ler who is now very old tells her a story, starting with his own childhood.

His family used to run a mill, but the Once-ler used to daydream about things he could invent instead. His family are poor and have to rent out the Once-ler's room to a lodger, so he decides to go and find his fortune elsewhere. While travelling, the Once-ler dreams that he will become rich as long as he has just one good idea ("I Could Be a Great Man").

He arrives in Paradise Valley and is delighted by all the new things he sees there. He sets to work, but when he cuts down a truffula tree the Lorax appears. The Lorax speaks for the trees and is angry one has been cut down. The Once-ler explains it was to make a "thneed", which the Lorax thinks is useless ("It's a Thneed"). He shows the Once-ler the beauty of the valley, and how he does not need to create anything new, everything he needs to live is in abundance in the valley ("Everything You Need's Right Here").

The Lorax leaves on his summer break after planting a new truffula tree seed. The Once-ler begins to see how silly his thneed idea is, until a businessman buys one. He throws himself into creating a new thneed business, and invites his family to join him and set up a thneed knitting factory. They are all very excited about becoming rich ("When We Get Rich").

The Lorax returns to find half the forest has been chopped down and confronts the Once-ler, arguing that the wildlife needs the trees to live as well. They agree that only trees in the area called "Once-ler Nook" will be cut down. Soon after, the factory runs out of trees. At first, the Once-ler says they must stop making thneeds, but his family and the people of the town pressure him into starting work again and cut down other trees in the valley ("Great Man").

They say he also made a promise to them that they would be rich, and persuade the Once-ler that if he continues he will become a powerful man. As a compromise, the Once-ler creates a nature reserve. The Lorax hates the idea and is upset about the pollution, which is killing the animals; he just wants the forest to return to how it was before. Instead of stopping, the Once-ler creates a super axe hacker which cuts down trees even faster ("Super Axe Hacker").

=== Act II ===
Two factory workers are opening the factory, meanwhile the Lorax sneaks inside with the animals of the forest. They start a protest to save the trees, and a TV news crew turns up to report it. The Once-ler tries to impress Samelore the reporter with his machinery, but the Lorax exposes all the pollution the factory is creating and how it is affecting the wildlife ("We Are One").

The Once-ler starts to apologize to the viewers at home. As he agrees to shut the factory, he announces a new version of the thneed, which makes it even more popular ("Thneed 2.0"). The Lorax sits alone on a stump and watches all the animals leave the area. The Once-ler treks up to visit him, to ask if they can still be friends. The Lorax says he is leaving because the forest has gone. He leaves the Once-ler with one word that he does not understand – "unless". At that moment, the last truffula tree is cut down.

The Once-ler's family pack up their things and leave along with the rest of the town ("When We Get Rich" (reprise)). The Once-ler is left on his own, the story ends. The kid who has been listening to the story says that it cannot be the end – she wants to know what "unless" means. The Once-ler has been thinking about it for years, but does not understand and cannot think of a way to bring the Lorax back when there is no forest. The kid has an idea, they need to plant a new truffula tree. The Once-ler says it will not work without a Lorax, but the kid persuades him to let her try. She plants the seed, waters it and waits, and finally it begins to grow ("Take It Wherever You Go"). The Once-ler is thrilled, and the kid asks if the Lorax will come back. They finally realise that a Lorax is just someone, anyone, who looks after trees. His last word meant that nothing will get better unless someone like the kid cares enough to protect them and keep planting ("Take It Wherever You Go" (reprise)).

== Musical numbers ==
Act I

- "Life is Tough" – Ensemble
- "I Could Be a Great Man" – The Once-ler and Ensemble
- "It's a Thneed" – The Once-ler
- "Everything You Need's Right Here" – The Lorax, The Once-ler and Ensemble
- "When We Get Rich" – The Once-ler and Once-ler Family
- "Great Man" – Von Goo, McGee, and McGann
- "Super Axe Hacker" – The Once-ler and Ensemble

Act II

- "We Are One" – The Lorax and Ensemble
- "Thneed 2.0" – The Once-ler and Ensemble
- "When We Get Rich" (reprise) – Once-ler Family
- "Take It Wherever You Go" – The Lorax
- "Take It Wherever You Go" (reprise) – Ensemble

== Critical reception ==
The production received rave reviews and was nominated for Best Entertainment and Family at the 2016 Laurence Olivier Awards.
