= William Sutcliffe =

British novelist

- Born: 9 March 1971 (age 55); London, UK
- Education: Emmanuel College, Cambridge
- Occupation: Novelist
- Spouse: Maggie O'Farrell
- Children: 3
- Writing career
- Genres: fiction, humour, satire
- Website: www.bloomsbury.com/author/william-sutcliffe

William Sutcliffe (born 9 March 1971) is a British novelist. He has written many acclaimed novels, spanning genres from satire to YA fiction. His 2008 book Whatever Makes You Happy has been adapted into a 2019 film by Netflix, under the title Otherhood.

== Novels ==
Sutcliffe's novels could be categorised as humorous. New Boy has much authentic material in it that refers to actual incidents from his life at his private school, although it would be going too far to call it "autobiographical".

His next novel concerns a 10-year-old growing up in a North London suburb with his family, and the plot centres on the complex knot of his childhood friendships. Sutcliffe's 2008 book Whatever Makes You Happy (2008) is about interfering mothers of men who refuse to grow up. This has recently been adapted into a film by Netflix, under the new title Otherhood. His first young adult novel, The Wall (2013), tells of a boy in Israel's Occupied Territories whose discovery of a tunnel underneath the barrier wall sets off a spiralling chain of events after he goes under and is saved from his attackers by a girl on the other side. Following on from the success of his first YA novel, Sutcliffe wrote his second, Concentr8, in (2015).

In 2009, he donated the short story Sandcastles: A Negotiation to Oxfam's 'Ox-Tales' project, four collections of UK stories written by 38 authors. Sutcliffe's story was published in the 'Fire' collection.

More recently, Sutcliffe has been writing more humorous books for a younger audience, with his Circus of Thieves trilogy. He has also written a humorous novel for teenagers, The Gifted, the Talented and Me. The book had an extremely good reception, gaining positive reviews in many newspapers.

== Personal life ==
Sutcliffe was born in 1971, in London. He was educated at Haberdashers' Aske's School and Emmanuel College, Cambridge, where he read English literature. He later worked as a TV researcher before becoming a novelist. He now lives in Edinburgh with his wife the novelist Maggie O'Farrell, and their three children.

== Bibliography ==
Books for Adults

- New Boy (1996)
- Are You Experienced? (1997)
- The Love Hexagon (2000)
- Whatever Makes You Happy (2008)

Books for Adults and Young Adults

- Bad Influence (2004)
- The Wall (2013)
- Concentr8 (2015)
- We See Everything (2017)
- The Gifted, Talented and Me (2019)
- The Summer We Turned Green (2021)

Books for Younger Readers

- Circus of Thieves and the Raffle of Doom (2014)
- Circus of Thieves on the Rampage (2015)
- Circus of Thieves and the Comeback Caper (2016)

== See also ==
- List of British Jewish writers
