= Manchester Opera House =

English commercial touring theatre

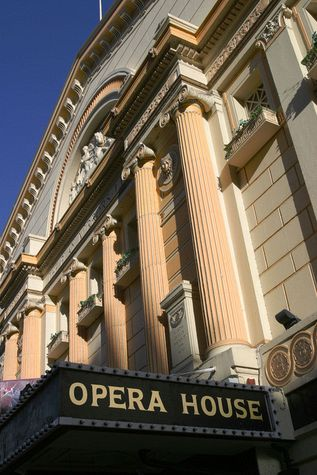
- Address: 3 Quay Street; Manchester; England
- Coordinates: 53°28′44″N 2°15′05″W
- Owner: Ambassador Theatre Group as a CIO
- Capacity: 1,920
- Type: Receiving house

Construction
- Opened: 1912
- Architects: Richardson & Gill with Farquarson

Website
- Official website

Listed Building – Grade II
- Official name: The Opera House
- Designated: 3 October 1974
- Reference no.: 1247470

The Opera House in Quay Street, Manchester, England, is a 1,920-seater commercial touring theatre that plays host to touring musicals, ballet, concerts and a Christmas pantomime. It is a Grade II listed building and one of the main theatres in Manchester. The Opera House and its sister theatre the Palace Theatre on Oxford Street are operated by the same parent company, Ambassador Theatre Group.

== History ==
The theatre opened as the New Theatre in 1912, renamed the New Queen's Theatre in 1915 and as the Opera House in 1920 when it came under the wing of John Hart and his associates of United Theatres Ltd. In 1931, it was bought by, and prospered under, Howard & Wyndham Ltd which had been formed at the Theatre Royal, Glasgow in 1895 by Michael Simons. The group's managing director A Stewart Cruikshank, headquartered at the group's headquarters in the King's Theatre, Edinburgh, was joined on the board by Charles B Cochrane who now became a visiting producer at the Opera House, premiering numerous musicals and revues. The theatre staged the full range of plays, musicals, opera, and pantomime.

It closed in 1979 and for five years was a bingo hall. The Palace Trust acquired it in 1984 and returned it to a theatre. In 1990, it was acquired by Apollo Leisure and staged large-scale musicals. It was subsequently sold to Ambassador Theatre Group in 2009. In March 2020, the theatre acquired Charitable Incorporated Organisation status along with the Palace Theatre.

== Architecture ==
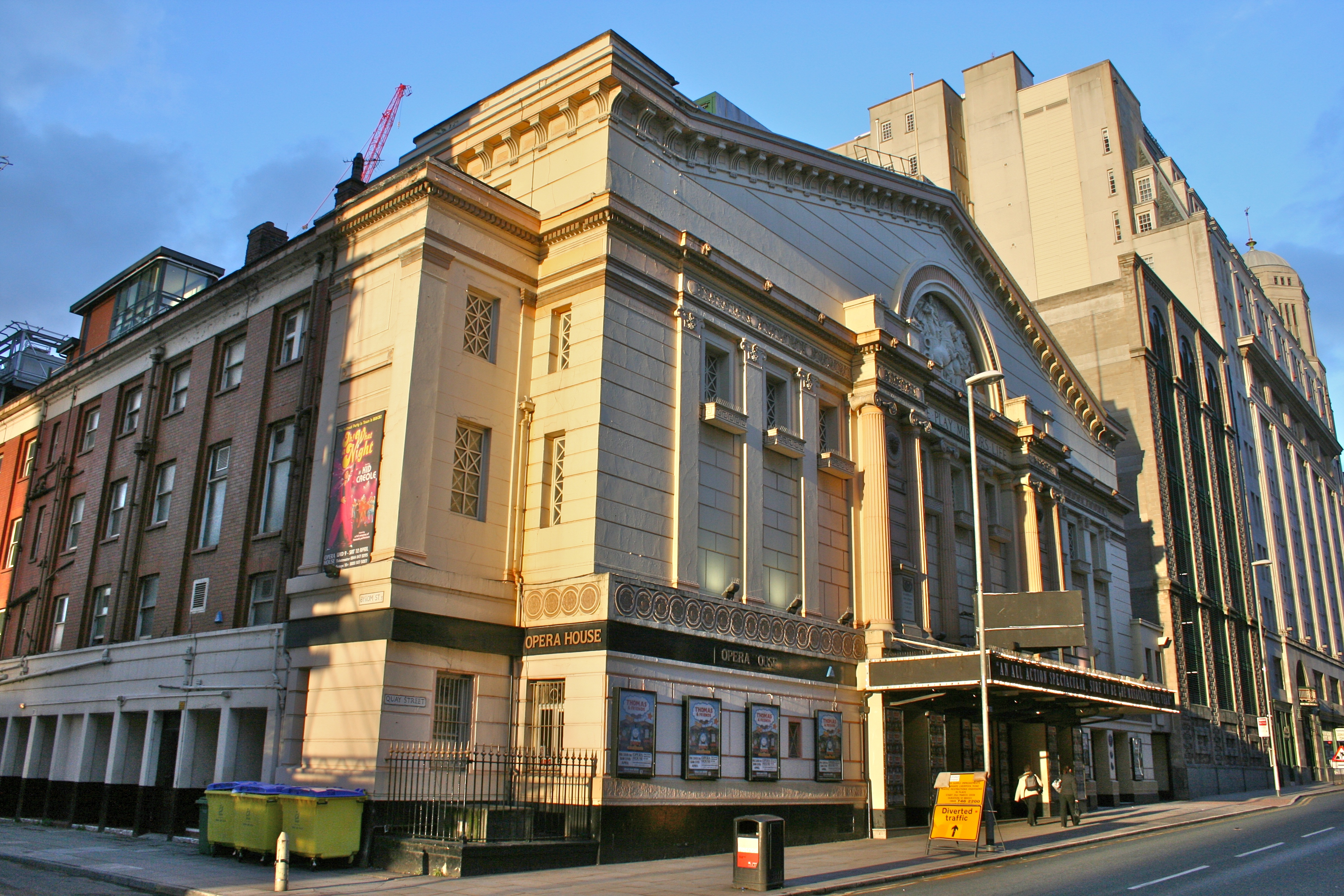
Opera House, Manchester

The theatre has a rectangular plan and is built of stuccoed brick with a slate roof. Its symmetrical fifteen-bay façade is in the classical style with a five-bay centre with fluted Ionic columns. Above the three central bays is a relief of a horse-drawn chariot within a semi-circular arch. The gable has a moulded cornice on brackets. The entrance canopy is a 20th-century addition.

The auditorium has two curved cantilevered balconies with large overhangs, each holding 500 seats. Either side of the stage are stacked boxes between pairs of fluted Corinthian columns. The high proscenium arch is decorated with a circular medallion flanked by gryphons. The high ceiling above the auditorium takes the form of a coffered segmental tunnel vault.

The stage is 42 ft (13 m) deep and 37 ft (11 m) wide. The orchestra pit holds 80 musicians. The theatre has 1,920 seats. The theatre was redecorated in March 2011 keeping the green and gold colour scheme of the auditorium unchanged.

== Notable productions and premieres ==
- 1952 – Premiere of The River Line
- 1957 – Premiere of Silver Wedding
- 1958 – European premiere of West Side Story
- 1993 to 1995 – British regional premiere of Andrew Lloyd Webber's musical The Phantom of the Opera
- 2005 – Demon Days Live concert by Gorillaz
- 2011 – World premiere of Ghost The Musical
- 2012 – UK premiere of Dolly Parton's musical 9 to 5
- 2017 – World premiere of Bat Out of Hell: The Musical
- 2017 – World premiere of Take That's musical The Band
- 2019 – World premiere of & Juliet
- 2020 – World premiere of Back to the Future: The Musical
- 2022 – UK premiere of Mrs. Doubtfire
- 2023 – World premiere of I Should Be So Lucky
- 2024 – World premiere of Burlesque
- 2025 – World premiere of A Knight's Tale: The Musical
- 2025 – World premiere of 13 Going on 30: The Musical

== See also ==
- Listed buildings in Manchester-M3
- Live Nation deal – Ambassador Theatre Group's acquisition of venues previously owned by Live Nation UK
- Palace Theatre
