= Scott Garnham =

English actor

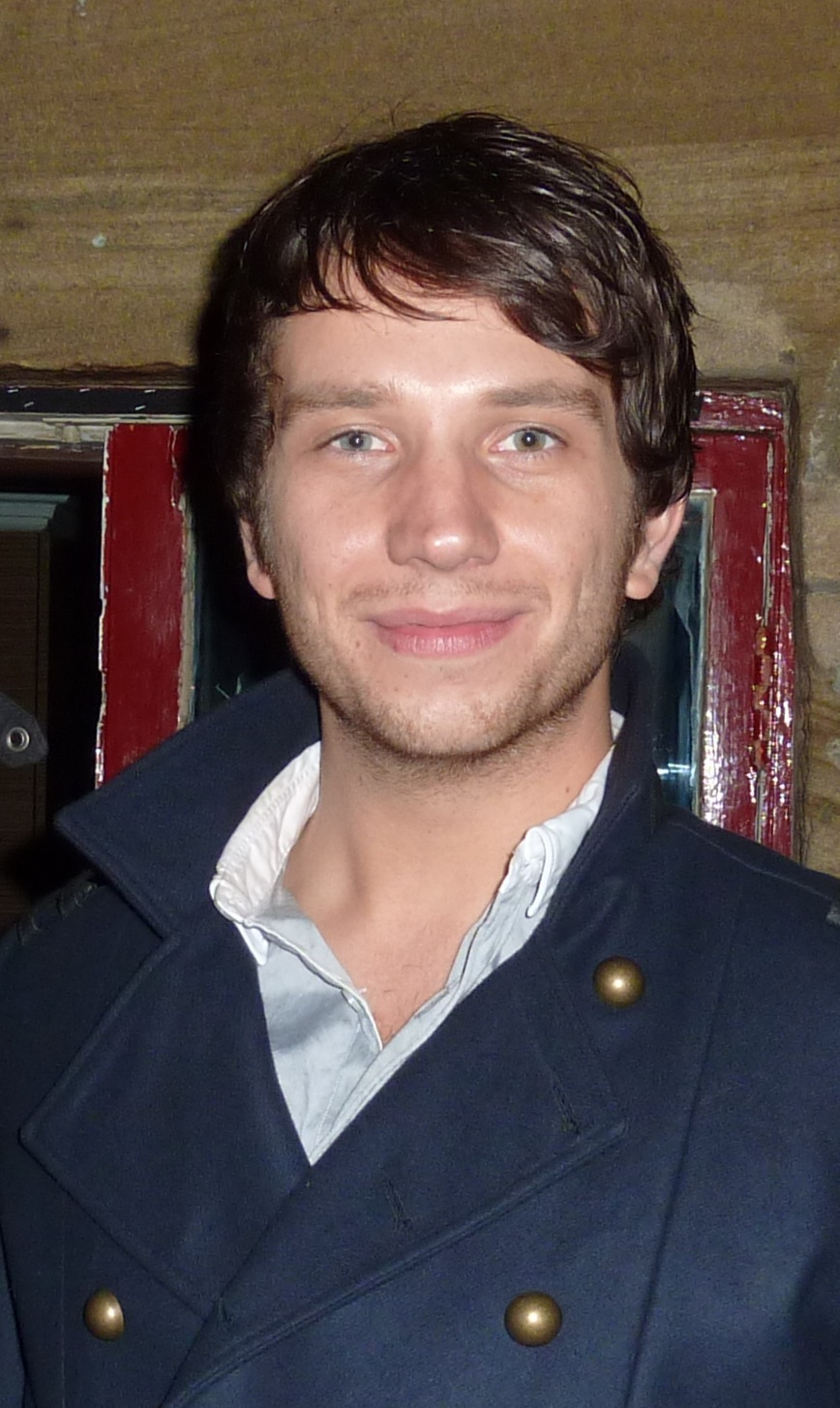
- Garnham at the Queen's Theatre (2011)
- Born: 22 February 1985 (age 41); Malton, North Yorkshire, England
- Education: Royal Scottish Academy of Music and Drama
- Occupation: Actor
- Years active: 2006 – present

Scott Garnham (born 22 February 1985) is an English actor. Notable credits include Billy Elliot The Musical, Les Misérables, Made in Dagenham directed by Rupert Goold, and Pompidou by Matt Lucas for the BBC.

== Early life ==
Garnham was born in Malton, North Yorkshire and attended Norton Community Primary School and later Norton College. He graduated, with a master's degree, from the Royal Scottish Academy of Music and Drama, later known as the Royal Conservatoire of Scotland, in 2006.

Garnham began acting at the age of 7 attending classes at Kirkham Henry Performing Arts, based in Malton, and later performing with many local amateur theatre groups.

== Early career ==
At the age of twelve Garnham appeared in the original cast of Stiles and Drewe's Honk! The Ugly Duckling, directed by Julia McKenzie, at the Stephen Joseph Theatre in Scarborough.

== Career ==
Garnham made his west end debut in Eurovision Song Contest spoof Eurobeat, earning positive critical responses, including a Daily Express review, declaring "a stand-out performance from Scott Garnham." Garnham played Irish entrant Ronan Corr in a performance using an all-white outfit and plentiful use of dry ice.

Following Eurobeat, Garnham obtained the role of Feuilly in the West End production of Les Misérables while also understudying the roles of Enjolras and Marius, a job which won him the accolade of Understudy of the Year 2011. The performance also earned him a spot in the Les Misérables: 25th Anniversary Concert alongside Matt Lucas, Alfie Boe and Nick Jonas.

== Stage work ==
- Nativity! The Musical, UK Tour (2019) ...Paul Maddens
- Nativity! The Musical, UK Tour (2018) ...Paul Maddens
- Billy Elliot, UK & Ireland Tour (2016/17) ...Tony
- Grand Hotel, Southwark Playhouse (2015) ...Baron Felix Von Gaigern
- Titanic, Princess of Wales Theatre, Toronto (2015) ...Edgar Beane
- Made in Dagenham, Original Cast, Adelphi Theatre (2014) ...Buddy Cortina
- I Can't Sing, Original Cast, London Palladium (2014) ...u/s Liam O'Deary
- title of show, London Premiere, Landor Theatre (2013) ...Hunter
- A Little Night Music, Yvonne Arnaud Theatre (2013) ...Mr Lindquist
- Les Misérables, Queen's Theatre (2010) ...Feuilly, u/s Enjolras & Marius
- Les Misérables: 25th Anniversary Concert, O2 Arena London (2010)
- Never Forget (musical), national tour (2009) ...Joze Reize
- Jason and the Argonauts, New Victory Theatre (2009) ...Jason
- Eurobeat - Almost Eurovision, Original Cast, Novello Theatre (2008) ...Ronan Corr
- The Rise and Fall of Little Voice, Visible Fictions (2007) ...Billy
- Honk!, Original Cast, Stephen Joseph Theatre, Scarborough, North Yorkshire (1997)

== Television work ==
- Pompidou, BBC/ John Stanley Productions (2014)
- Les Mis at 25: Matt Lucas Dreams the Dream, BBC (2010)
- MacMusical, BBC, (2007)
