= List of highest-grossing Christmas films =

The following is a page of the highest-grossing Christmas-themed films. The gross is not inflation adjusted.. Universal is the most prominent distributor of Christmas films, having ten films on this list total. Home Alone held the title of the highest-grossing Christmas film for twenty-eight years, before being surpassed by The Grinch in 2018. 2003, 2006, 2007, and 2017 are the most prominent release years, with three films each.

== Highest-grossing Christmas films ==
† Background shading indicates films playing in the week commencing 20 November 2026 in theaters around the world.

Rank	Title	Worldwide gross	Distributor	Year	Ref
1	The Grinch	$552,976,825	Universal	2018	
2	Home Alone	$476,684,675	20th Century Fox	1990	
3	Alvin and the Chipmunks	$365,352,546	20th Century Fox	2007	
4	Home Alone 2: Lost in New York	$358,994,850	20th Century Fox	1992	
5	Dr. Seuss' How the Grinch Stole Christmas	$350,474,504	Universal	2000	
6	The Polar Express	$328,972,415	Warner Bros.	2004	
7	A Christmas Carol	$325,286,646	Disney	2009	
8	Batman Returns	$266,831,698	Warner Bros.	1992	
9	Love Actually	$245,203,167	Universal	2003	
10	Die Hard 2	$240,031,274	20th Century Fox	1990	
11	Elf	$232,908,088	New Line Cinema	2003	
12	The Holiday	$205,850,134	Sony	2006	
13	The Santa Clause	$190,539,357	Disney	1994	
14	Red One	$184,894,014	Amazon MGM	2024	
15	While You Were Sleeping	$182,057,016	Disney	1995	
16	Daddy's Home 2	$180,613,824	Paramount	2017	
17	The Nutcracker and the Four Realms	$173,961,069	Disney	2018	
18	The Santa Clause 2	$172,855,065	Disney	2002	
19	Four Christmases	$163,733,697	Warner Bros.	2008	
20	Gremlins	$153,898,890	Warner Bros.	1984	
21	Arthur Christmas	$147,419,472	Sony	2011	
22	A Bad Moms Christmas	$130,560,428	STXfilms	2017	
23	Jingle All the Way	$129,832,389	20th Century Fox	1996	
24	The Family Man	$124,745,083	Universal	2000	
25	Last Christmas	$121,550,750	Universal	2019	
26	Why Him?	$118,102,725	20th Century Fox	2016	
27	Office Christmas Party	$114,501,299	Paramount	2016	
28	The Santa Clause 3: The Escape Clause	$110,768,122	Disney	2006	
29	The Nightmare Before Christmas	$108,777,663	Disney	1993	
30	Ghosts of Girlfriends Past	$102,366,815	Warner Bros.	2009	
31	Fred Claus	$97,838,349	Warner Bros.	2007	
32	Christmas with the Kranks	$96,593,018	Sony	2004	
33	The Family Stone	$92,884,429	20th Century Fox	2005	
34	National Lampoon's Christmas Vacation	$78,914,670	Warner Bros.	1989	
35	Serendipity	$77,516,304	Miramax	2001	
36	Violent Night	$76,492,442	Universal	2022	
37	Bad Santa	$76,488,889	Miramax / Sony	2003	
38	The Best Man Holiday	$72,835,710	Universal	2013	
39	The Star	$62,812,974	Sony	2017	
40	Krampus	$61,548,707	Universal	2015	
41	Scrooged	$60,328,558	Paramount	1988	
42	The Preacher's Wife	$56,432,646	Buena Vista	1996	
43	A Madea Christmas	$53,396,354	Lionsgate	2015	
44	Just Friends	$50,912,434	New Line Cinema	2005	
45	This Christmas	$49,778,552	Sony	2007	
46	The Holdovers	$48,828,052	Universal	2023	
47	Ebenezer	$47,846,820	Paramount	2026	
48	Deck the Halls	$47,231,070	20th Century Fox	2006	
49	Miracle on 34th Street	$46,264,384	20th Century Fox	1994	
50	Almost Christmas	$42,580,920	Universal	2016	

== Highest-grossing Christmas film franchises ==
The following is a list of highest-grossing Christmas film series and franchises. How the Grinch Stole Christmas tops the list with $866.6 million and also has the best average with $443.3 million. Home Alone follows closely behind with $835.6 million and an average of $417.8 million. While the first three Home Alone films had theatrical releases, the third film is excluded due to it not being set during Christmas.

Highest-grossing Christmas franchises and film series^{[§]}-

Rank	Series	Total worldwide box office	No. of films	Average of films	Highest-grossing film

1	How the Grinch Stole Christmas!	$886,649,750	2	$443,324,875	The Grinch ($540,826,718)
1	The Grinch (2018)	$540,826,718			
2	How the Grinch Stole Christmas (2000)	$345,823,032			

2	Home Alone	$835,679,525	2	$417,839,763	Home Alone ($476,684,675)
1	Home Alone (1990)	$476,684,675			
2	Lost in New York (1992)	$358,994,850			

3	The Santa Clause	$470,125,976	3	$156,708,659	The Santa Clause ($189,800,000)
1	The Santa Clause (1994)	$189,800,000			
2	The Santa Clause 2 (2002)	$172,825,854			
3	The Escape Clause (2006)	$107,500,122			

4	Die Hard	$381,634,471	2	$190,817,236	Die Hard 2 ($240,031,274)
1	Die Hard 2 (1990)	$240,031,274			
2	Die Hard (1988)	$141,603,197			

5	Bad Santa	$100,568,157	2	$50,284,079	Bad Santa ($76,488,889)
1	Bad Santa (2003)	$76,488,889			
2	Bad Santa 2 (2016)	$24,079,268			

6	Nativity	$38,341,737	4	$9,585,434	Danger in the Manger ($14,433,981)
1	Danger in the Manger (2012)	$14,433,981			
2	Dude, Where's My Donkey? (2014)	$11,283,866			
3	Nativity! (2009)	$8,494,434			
4	Rocks! This Ain't No Silent Night (2018)	$4,129,456			

7	Silent Night, Deadly Night	$5,501,891	4	$1,375,473	Silent Night, Deadly Night (2025) ($2,756,043)
1	Silent Night, Deadly Night (2025)	$2,756,043			
2	Silent Night, Deadly Night (1983)	$2,491,460			
3	Silent Night, Deadly Night Part 2 (1987)	$154,323			
4	Silent Night (2012)	$100,065			

== Biggest worldwide openings for Christmas films ==
This list charts the largest opens for Christmas films worldwide. Since Christmas films do not open on Fridays in many markets, the 'opening' is taken to be the gross between the first day of release and the first Sunday.

Figures are given in United States dollars (USD). Films must open to over $1 million.

This list does not take into account country-by-country variations in release dates. Therefore, in some cases opening weekend grosses from many, or even most countries may not be included.

Rank	Film	Worldwide opening	Year	Ref
1	The Grinch	$67,752,855	2018	
2	Dr. Seuss' How the Grinch Stole Christmas	$55,082,330	2000	
3	Love Actually	$45,569,086	2003	
4	Ebenezer	$42,000,000	2026	
5	Red One	$32,106,112	2024	
6	Elf	$31,113,501	2003	
7	The Best Man Holiday	$30,107,555	2013	
8	A Christmas Carol	$30,051,075	2009	
9	The Santa Clause 2	$29,008,696	2002	
10	The Polar Express	$24,341,868	2004	
11	The Nutcracker and the Four Realms	$20,352,491	2018	
12	Arthur Christmas	$15,442,585	2011	

== Christmas films by ticket sold ==
The following is a list of Christmas films by estimated tickets sold at the worldwide box office. The following films sold more than 1 million tickets worldwide.

Film	Year	Ticket sales (est.)	Ref
Home Alone	1990	81,491,808	(Note: Home Alone admissions: United States, Canada, Spain – 70,521,419; France, Germany, Italy – 10,032,435; South Korea (Seoul City) – 869,820; United Kingdom, Belgium, Romania, Switzerland (1996–2018) – 68,134)

== See also ==
- Lists of highest-grossing films
- List of Christmas films
- Santa Claus in film
