= Misha Manson-Smith =

British director

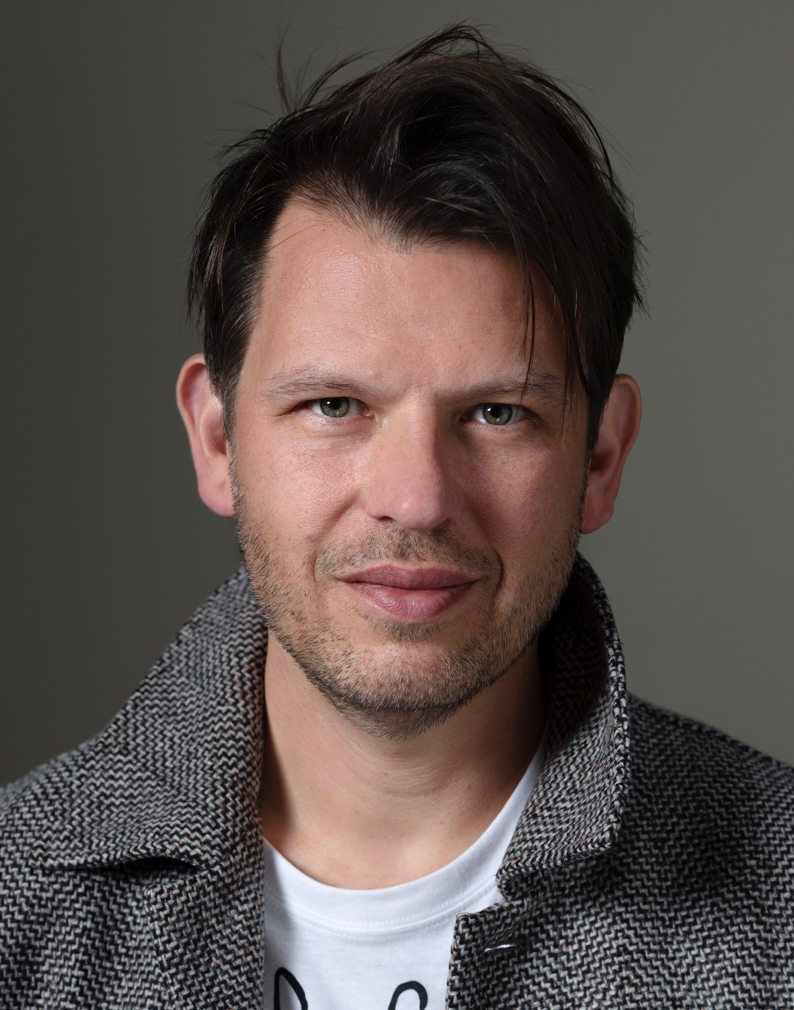
- Years active: 2004-present
- Notable work: The Jury; The Feed; Kiss Me First; No Offence; La La Land

Misha Manson-Smith is a British director and screenwriter. He is known for directing high-end television dramas including The Feed, Kiss Me First and No Offence and for creating satirical comedy series with Marc Wootton that blur fiction and reality. He has been nominated for three BAFTAs including the Breakthrough Talent Award for Directing.

== Career ==
=== 2004-2012 ===
Manson-Smith started working professionally as an editor on documentaries for directors such as Greg Barker and James Miller. In 2004, Miller was shot and killed by the Israel Defense Forces while filming HBO documentary feature film Death In Gaza. Manson-Smith came on as editor and director to complete it, interweaving Miller’s own story with those of the children caught in the crossfire. It premiered at the Berlin Film Festival and won many accolades, among them three Emmy Awards, including Exceptional Merit in Non-Fiction Filmmaking. It also won a BAFTA Award and Manson-Smith was nominated for the BAFTA Award for editing.

Manson-Smith also started writing and directing fiction with short Nine and a Half Minutes. Produced by Ollie Madden and starring David Tennant, it premiered at the Edinburgh International Film Festival.

Manson-Smith went on to develop and direct broadcast pilots including BAFTA-nominated Delta Forever (2008) starring Daniel Kaluuya and Ophelia Lovibond, Coming Up: Brussels (2009) starring Peter Capaldi and Stanley Park (2011) starring Holliday Grainger and Sharon Horgan.

In 2011, it was announced that Manson-Smith had been hired to direct the feature film Sex Education.

=== 2012-present ===
In 2012, Manson-Smith directed single drama Excluded for BBC Two, starring Craig Parkinson, Monica Dolan and Juliet Cowan. Sam Wollaston wrote in the Guardian “It's all brilliant – immediate, tense, funny, sad, touching, relevant.”

In 2014, Manson-Smith created neo-noir action comedy In Deep (2014) with writers Thomas Eccleshare and Tom Joseph for BBC Three. Manson-Smith directed the pilot, casting Ashley Walters and Paul Kaye.

In 2015, Manson-Smith developed Hoff The Record, an improvised comedy about Craig Roberts directing a biopic of David Hasslehoff. Manson-Smith wrote and directed the pilot for BBC Two and wrote on the first season for Dave with Mickey Down and Konrad Kay. It won the International Emmy Award for Comedy Series.

In 2016-2019, Manson-Smith directed episodes of Paul Abbott’s No Offence, which was BAFTA nominated for Best Drama Series and won the RTS Award for Best Drama Series. Manson-Smith returned to direct action sequences on the second season and the final episodes of the third season

In 2017, Manson-Smith was lead director on the second season of Danny Brocklehurst’s Ordinary Lies, starring Con O’Neil, Rebekah Staton, Joel Fry and Kimberley Nixon, who won the Best Actress BAFTA Cymru Award.

In 2018, Manson-Smith was the lead director on cyber-thriller Kiss Me First for Netflix and Channel 4. Adapted by Bryan Elsley from Lottie Moggach’s novel, the series combined live action drama with motion capture animation, winning an RTS Award. Among many unusual aspects of the production, Manson-Smith used the actual lenses made for Apocalypse Now.

In 2019, Manson-Smith directed David Thewlis, Michelle Fairley and Guy Burnet in episodes (and additional action sequences) of sci-fi thriller series The Feed for Amazon Studios. It was selected for the Cannes Series and Tallinn Black Nights Festivals. In 2020 it was nominated for Best Drama Series at the National Film Awards.

In 2025, Manson-Smith directed the second season of The Jury: Murder Trial for Channel 4, a hybrid courtroom drama / social experiment that in its first season won the 2025 BAFTA TV Award, Broadcast Award and was nominated for the RTS Award. The second season was nominated in the 2026 BAFTA TV Awards, nominated in the RTS Programme and RTS Craft Awards, nominated in the Grierson Awards and Edinburgh TV Awards and won the Rose d'Or.

In 2026, Manson-Smith directed the third and fourth seasons of The Jury: Murder Trial. He also directed two episodes of The Detection Club "Death and All That Jazz" and "The Perfect Murder" for BBC Studios and Britbox. And at the 2026 Edinburgh Television Festival, it was announced that Manson-Smith would direct and executive produce To Nicola, Love Peter a feature film commissioned by Channel 5, telling the story of how Nicola Sturgeon's husband, Peter Murrell, embezzled SNP party funds.

=== Collaborators ===
Manson-Smith has developed several films with writer George Kay, with short Barbados becoming their first produced work. Starring Michael Sheen and produced by Fred Berger and Funny or Die, it was selected for the Toronto International Film Festival.

Manson-Smith frequently collaborates with actor Marc Wootton. My New Best Friend won the Rose D'Or and a British Comedy Award, with Guardian critic Barbara Ellen writing that it “transcends student TV and becomes a sociological document for the cut-throat nature of our times”. Manson-Smith and Wootton reteamed on controversial BBC psychic satire High Spirits with Shirley Ghostman, earning Manson-Smith a BAFTA nomination.

Manson-Smith and Wootton relocated to Los Angeles to create entertainment industry satire La La Land for Showtime. Notable for its casting of cult figures including Tommy Wiseau and Daryl Hannah, it was nominated for the Rose D’Or and received positive reviews, with Heather Havrilesky writing in Salon that La La Land "may be the single funniest thing I've seen on TV in the past year.”

In 2019, it was announced that Manson-Smith and Wootton were to team with Sacha Baron Cohen and his production company Four by Two Films on Gooseberry "an audacious collision of comic thriller and immersive theatre". Manson-Smith shot the pilot with Lionsgate for Comedy Central in Los Angeles in 2020, but the series was cancelled due to the Covid-19 pandemic.

In 2025, Manson-Smith and Wootton collaborated with singer-songwriter John Grant on the release of short film The Art of the Lie, with Shots Magazine writing "What began as a music video for Grant’s track It’s A Bitch quickly spiralled into something far more ambitious: a metafictional satire... held together by Wootton's unwavering performance... this 30-minute gem is chock-full of laughs"

=== Commercials ===
Manson-Smith has written and directed numerous commercials described variously as "beautifully observed" "remarkably authentic" and "perfectly deadpan". His "brilliantly conceived" campaign for Google starring Nick Mohammed, Olly Alexander and Jessica Barden was selected for the APA’s top 50. In 2023, he directed commercials for Swarovski starring Aimee Lou Wood and 2026 commericals for KFC.

== Personal life ==
Manson-Smith and his wife Alex Manson-Smith, a writer, live in London Fields with their two sons.

== Filmography ==
Year	Title	Network	Director	Writer	EP	Notes
2004	Nine and a Half Minutes	BFI	Yes	Yes	No	Short film
2004	Death in Gaza	HBO	Yes	No	No	Feature documentary
2004	My New Best Friend	Channel 4	Yes	Yes	No	6 episodes
2008	Delta Forever	BBC Three	Yes	Yes	No	Pilot
2008	High Spirits with Shirley Ghostman	BBC Three BBC America	Yes	Yes	No	8 episodes
2008	Coming Up: Brussels	Channel 4	Yes	No	No	Single drama
2010	La La Land	Showtime	Yes	Yes	Yes	6 episodes
2011	Stanley Park	Lionsgate BBC Three	Yes	No	No	Pilot
2012	Excluded	BBC Two	Yes	No	No	Single drama
2013	Dancing on the Edge	BBC Two	Yes	No	No	Uncredited
2013	Lucky Country	BBC Two	Yes	Yes	Yes	Pilot
2014	Pramface	BBC Three	Yes	No	No	6 episodes
2014	In Deep	BBC Three	Yes	No	Yes	Pilot, co-creator
2015	Hoff The Record	BBC Two Dave	Yes	Yes	No	Pilot
2016-2019	No Offence	Channel 4	Yes	No	No	4 episodes
2017	Barbados	Funny Or Die	Yes	No	No	Short film
2017	Ordinary Lies	BBC One	Yes	No	No	3 episodes
2018	Kiss Me First	Netflix Channel 4	Yes	No	No	3 episodes
2019	The Feed	Amazon Studios	Yes	No	No	2 episodes
2020	Gooseberry	Lionsgate Comedy Central	Yes	Yes	Yes	Pilot, co-creator
2025	The Art of the Lie	Common People Films	Yes	Yes	No	Short film
2025	The Jury: Murder Trial	Channel 4	Yes	No	No	4 episodes
2026	The Jury: Murder Trial	Channel 4	Yes	No	No	8 episodes
2026	The Detection Club	BBC One BBC Studios Britbox	Yes	No	No	2 episodes
2027	To Nicola, Love Peter (w/t)	Paramount Channel 5	Yes	No	Yes	Feature film

== Awards and nominations ==
Year	Award	Category	Work	Result
2004	Rose d'Or	Comedy	My New Best Friend	Win
2004	British Comedy Award	Best New Comedy	My New Best Friend	Win
2005	British Academy Television Craft Award	Best Editing: Factual	Death in Gaza	Nomination
2008	British Academy Television Craft Award	Breakthrough Talent: Fiction	High Spirits with Shirley Ghostman	Nomination
2009	British Academy Scotland Award	Comedy	Delta Forever	Nomination
2011	Rose D'Or	Comedy	La La Land	Nomination
2013	Shots Award	Branded Commercial	Google Analytics in Real Life	Win
2013	Cannes Lion	Commercial	Google Analytics in Real Life	Nomination
2013	IVCA	Commercial	Google Analytics in Real Life	Win
2016	New York Festivals	Best Performance	Clic Sargent: One of the Gang	Win
2016	Kinsale Shark Awards	Editing	Clic Sargent: One of the Gang	Win
2018	British Arrows	Craft	Kit Kat: Double Act	Win
2025	Rose d'Or	Factual Entertainment & Reality	The Jury: Murder Trial	Win
2026	British Academy Television Award	Reality	The Jury: Murder Trial	Nomination
2026	Royal Television Society Programme Award	Formatted Popular Factual	The Jury: Murder Trial	Nomination
2026	Royal Television Society Craft & Design Award	Multicamera Work	The Jury: Murder Trial	Nomination
2026	Edinburgh TV Award	Popular Factual Series	The Jury: Murder Trial	Nomination
2026	Grierson Award	Constructed Documentary	The Jury: Murder Trial	Nomination
