= Nativity Rocks! =

2018 British film by Debbie Isitt

Nativity! 4: Nativity Rocks!
- Directed by: Debbie Isitt
- Written by: Debbie Isitt
- Produced by: Nick Jones
- Starring: Simon Lipkin; Celia Imrie; Craig Revel Horwood; Helen George; Ruth Jones; Daniel Boys
- Cinematography: Sean Van Hales
- Music by: Nicky Ager
- Production company: Mirrorball Films
- Distributed by: Entertainment One
- Release date: 23 November 2018
- Running time: 100 minutes
- Country: United Kingdom
- Language: English
- Box office: $4.1 million

Nativity Rocks! (also known as Nativity 4) is a 2018 British Christmas comedy film and the fourth installment of the Nativity film series by Debbie Isitt. It stars Simon Lipkin, Celia Imrie, Craig Revel Horwood, Helen George, Ruth Jones & Daniel Boys. Like its predecessors, it was distributed by Entertainment One.

The only people who reprised their roles in this film were Celia Imrie (who portrayed Mrs Keen, the headteacher of St Bernadette's who took over from Mrs Bevan after Pam Ferris did not reprise her role in Nativity 3: Dude, Where's My Donkey?), Jessica Hynes (who portrayed Angel Matthews in Nativity 2: Danger in the Manger) and Lyla Peters (who portrayed a St Bernadettes Student in Nativity 3: Dude, Where's My Donkey?). Simon Lipkin and John Danziel play new characters, with Simon Lipkin who previously played a grotto elf in Nativity 3: Dude, Where's My Donkey?, playing a new character named Jerry Poppy, who is Desmond Poppy's younger brother. Jerry acts as a fill-in for Desmond as Marc Wootton did not return to reprise the character, and John Danziel who previously played a Judge in Nativity 2: Danger in the Manger plays a TV Reporter. In addition, Simon Lipkin had previously played the role of Desmond Poppy in Nativity! The Musical.

== Plot ==
Five years after Dude, Where's My Donkey?, Doru, a child refugee from Syria, is separated from his father as he arrives in the United Kingdom having been smuggled in illegally by boat and under fire. He is moved to Coventry by social worker Suzie Shelly and joins St Bernadette's Primary School, where he meets new teaching assistant Jerry Poppy, who assists him in his search for his father, amid another Christmas musical production for the school, led by impresario Emmanuel Cavendish. Jerry is immediately suspicious that Cavendish and he have met before, believing that his mother used to clean Cavendish's parents' house before Cavendish framed Jerry for stealing a brooch.

With nowhere to stay, Jerry and Doru end up staying with Barnaby, a lonely boy with rich parents who are often away (due to nefarious means by the father). After Jerry helps Barnaby decorate the house, he prompts Barnaby's mother Clara to start making more of an effort to be there for her son emotionally, rather than just providing for him financially. Cavendish's auditions for the show initially go well, but when Cavendish starts trying to take all the major parts for himself, he is fired by the schools so they can do it themselves. Doru’s father goes looking for Doru, and hitches a bus to Coventry.

== Cast ==
- Simon Lipkin as Jerry Poppy, the younger brother of Desmond Poppy, the previous teaching assistant from the last three Nativity films.
- Craig Revel Horwood as Emmanuel Cavendish, rock legend and Jerry's childhood bully.
- Daniel Boys as Mr. Ben Johnson, the fourth school teacher of St. Bernadette's since Martin Freeman as Mr. Paul Maddens in the first Nativity film, David Tennant as Mr. Donald Peterson in Nativity 2: Danger in the Manger and Martin Clunes as Mr. Jeremy Shepperd in Nativity 3: Dude, Where's My Donkey?.
- Brian Bartle as Doru, a lost child.
- Ramin Karimloo as Doru's Dad
- Helen George as Miss Suzie Shelly, Doru's social worker and Mr. Johnson's new love interest.
- Celia Imrie as Mrs. Keen, the current headmistress of St. Bernadette's. Imrie returns from Nativity 3: Dude, Where's My Donkey?.
- Jalisa Andrews as Miss Lisa Bailey, the assistant to Mrs. Keen replacing Rosie Cavaliero as Miss Lucy Rye, Mrs. Bevan's assistant who appeared in the first Nativity film and Nativity 2: Danger in the Manger.
- Gabriel Vick as Hugo Alexander, the new teacher at Oakmoor School replacing Jason Watkins as Gordon Shakespeare, the previous teacher from the last three Nativity films.
- Rupert Turnbull as Barnaby Hargreaves, a student at Oakmoor School and Doru's new friend.
- Anna Chancellor as Clara Hargreaves, Barnaby's mum.
- Hugh Dennis as Robert Hargreaves, Barnaby's dad.
- Ruth Jones as Farmer Beatie, a farmer who helps Doru and his dad find each other.
- Jamie Chapman as Tony, Cavendish's manager.
- Vincent Franklin as Lord Mayor, the mayor of Coventry replacing Ricky Tomlinson as the previous mayor from the first Nativity film.
- Meera Syal as Nina, a foster carer of Doru and a friend of Miss Shelly.
- Jessica Hynes as Angel Matthews, the singer of the rock opera. Hynes returns from Nativity 2: Danger in the Manger.

== Reception ==
The film has a Rotten Tomatoes score of 0% based on eight reviews.

When the film was released in the United Kingdom, it opened at #5, behind Fantastic Beasts: The Crimes of Grindelwald, The Grinch, Bohemian Rhapsody and Robin Hood.

== Future ==
In a 2015 interview with Feel Christmassy, before the release of Nativity Rocks!, Isitt stated that the fifth instalment in the series "has been developed" and that it would be set in Australia; she added, however, that she was "uncertain as to if or when [it] will be made". She also hinted on X in 2019 that she had a "Mr Poppy prequel ... on [her] slate". As of 2022, Coventry Telegraph said there had been "no [further] word on a potential fifth film"..

== See also ==
- 2018 in film
- List of British films of 2018
- List of Christmas films
