= Nativity! =

2009 British film by Debbie Isitt

- Theatrical release poster
- Directed by: Debbie Isitt
- Written by: Debbie Isitt
- Produced by: Nick Jones
- Starring: Martin Freeman; Marc Wootton; Ashley Jensen; Jason Watkins; Alan Carr; Pam Ferris; Ricky Tomlinson; Jay Loveridge
- Cinematography: Seán Van Hales
- Edited by: Nicky Ager
- Music by: Nicky Ager; Debbie Isitt
- Production companies: BBC Films; Mirrorball Films; Screen WM; Protagonist Pictures
- Distributed by: E1 Entertainment
- Release date: 27 November 2009
- Running time: 105 minutes
- Country: United Kingdom
- Language: English
- Budget: £1.8 million
- Box office: £6.4 million

Nativity! is a 2009 British Christmas musical comedy film directed by Debbie Isitt and released on 27 November 2009 and the first instalment in the Nativity film series. The film stars Martin Freeman and Marc Wootton. In the film, teacher Paul Maddens (Freeman) lies to his rival that Hollywood are coming to watch his school's Christmas nativity, but after the lie gets out of hand, he must resolve the issue and save his school fast. The film was written by its director, Debbie Isitt, but was also partially improvised.

The film is set and was made in Coventry, England and premiered on 23 November 2009 in the SkyDome Arena there.

It was released in cinemas on 27 November 2009. The film was followed by Nativity 2: Danger in the Manger (2012), Nativity 3: Dude, Where's My Donkey? (2014), and Nativity Rocks! (2018).

In 2017, a stage musical adaptation premiered and has since toured the UK over the subsequent Christmas seasons.

== Plot ==
Paul Maddens is a miserable, jaded teacher at St. Bernadette's, a local state-funded Catholic primary school in Coventry. He once had ambitions of being successful as an actor, producer or director in musical theatre, but gave it up after negative reviews in the press. Mr. Maddens grew to hate Christmas after his girlfriend at drama school, Jennifer Lore, broke up with him at Christmas time.

Every year, St Bernadette's competes with Oakmoor, the local posh Protestant private school, to see who can produce the best nativity play. The headteacher at St Bernadette's, Patricia Bevan, tasks Mr. Maddens with running their nativity this year and assigns him a new classroom assistant named Desmond Poppy, who is actually Mrs. Bevan's extremely childish, immature nephew searching for work.

While out shopping with Mr. Poppy for a new school Christmas tree, Mr. Maddens bumps into his old rival from drama school, Gordon Shakespeare, who runs the nativity plays at Oakmoor. Desperate not to be seen as a failure, Mr. Maddens lies to Mr. Shakespeare about how Jennifer, now a supposed Hollywood producer, will be turning his production into a Hollywood film (although in reality, he hasn't spoken to her in five years after she broke up with him). Mr. Poppy overhears this and gets so excited that he spreads the story to the press. Mr. Maddens finds his lie spiralling out of control, and all he can do is go along with it as media attention mounts and the children get very excited.

The children at St Bernadette's are not as talented as the Oakmoor students, and Mr. Maddens has little confidence in their abilities. Mr. Poppy helps him, and the class to create a nativity which showcases all of the children's talents.

Mr. Maddens tries to contact Jennifer to make the lie come true, even getting on a flight to America to persuade her to visit in-person. It turns out she is only the secretary to a film producer, and he returns home disappointed.

Amid continuing media attention and the Mayor's kind offer to allow the play to be performed in the historical ruins of Coventry Cathedral, Mrs. Bevan discovers that the Hollywood story was a lie and cancels the play, advising Mr. Maddens to start looking for another job and firing Mr. Poppy in the process. This causes Mr. Maddens to calmly snap at Mr. Poppy about everything going wrong, but when facing his disappointed class, he has a change of heart and realises that he must save the play.

Mr. Maddens breaks the news to the class that they are still doing the play despite it being cancelled. He and Mr. Poppy make up after Mr. Maddens apologies to Mr. Poppy for what he said to him. They both remove the "Cancelled" banners on the posters, therefore restoring the play to its full glory. Despite Mrs. Bevan's attempts to stop Mr. Madden from doing the play, the play is performed at the cathedral to an audience of the children's parents and family friends. The children, initially anxious but motivated and encouraged by Mr. Poppy's childlike spirit and optimism, actually put on a decent performance, to the surprise of everyone involved. Halfway through, Mr. Shakespeare climbs on stage to tell everybody that there is nobody from Hollywood there and the entire story was a lie. Luckily, a helicopter flies over and Mr. Poppy declares that it's Hollywood arriving; the show continues, and Jennifer and her boss, Mr. Parker indeed appear at the back to watch. Mr. Maddens joins them and, still in love, kisses Jennifer. The play ends with everyone, including Mr. Shakespeare and Mrs. Bevan, who have a change of heart after seeing the children's talents, united onstage to celebrate the children's success.

As the film closes, Mr. Maddens and Jennifer are shown decorating his house together for Christmas, reunited at last.

== Cast ==
- Martin Freeman as Paul Maddens, a primary school teacher trying to produce and direct a nativity play that will for once outdo a rival school
- Marc Wootton as Desmond Poppy, the immature nephew of Mrs. Bevan, whom she appoints as a classroom assistant
- Jason Watkins as Gordon Shakespeare, a private primary school teacher and long-time rival of Paul
- Ashley Jensen as Jennifer Lore, formerly a Hollywood secretary and Mr. Maddens' girlfriend at the end of the film
- Alan Carr as Patrick Burns, critic
- Ricky Tomlinson as The Mayor
- John Sessions as Mr. Lore
- Phyllis Logan as Mrs. Lore
- Pam Ferris as Patricia Bevan, the headmistress of St. Bernadette's Primary School
- Clarke Peters as Mr. Parker, a Hollywood director, Jennifer's boss during her time at Hollywood
- Geoffrey Hutchings as Father Tom
- Rosie Cavaliero as Miss Rye
- Selina Cadell as Oakmoor Headmistress
- Ashley Blake as himself

Mr. Maddens' class	Mr. Shakespeare's class
Alexandra Allen as Cleo	Adeste McLeod as Grace
Ben Wilby as Bob	Anna Price as Ellen
Bernard Mensah as TJ	Arun Nahar as Jake
Brandon McDonald as Olly	Bessie Cursons as Christy
Cadi Mullane as Crystal	Bethany Carter as Daisy
Caitlin Cronin as Lucy	Charlie Dixon as Thomas
Dominic McKernan as Dan	Cherie Ng as Nicola
Ellie Coldicutt as Beth	Eleanor Bonas as Rachel
Faye Dolan as Jade	Francesca York as Caroline
James Warner as Buddy	Freddie Watkins as Sebastian
Jake Pratt as Alfie	Georgina Owen as Emily
Joe Lane as Edward	Hannah Ciotknowski as Elizabeth
Joshan Patel as Bill	Harriet Kilner as Charlotte
Krista Hyatt as Becky	Hayley Downing as Victoria
Maeve Dolan as Sam	Imogen Stern as Phoebe
Michael McAuley as William	Katie Maguire as Megan
Daisy Churchill as Neve	Katie Stafford as Molly
Morgan Brennan as Charlotte	Lauren Downing as Joanne
Rebecca Maguire as Saffron	Lily-Rose Sharry as Lynette
Oscar Hiscock as Fraser	Michael Brown as Charles
Rhyannon Jones as Alice	Molly Burton as Catherine
Sam Tott as Matt	Mi Tuulikki Kelly as Lorna
Sydney Isitt-Ager as Sadie	Safiya Asharia as Sophie
Thomas McGarrity as Zack	Salim Zayyan as Percival
Oscar Steer as Billy	Behrad Koohy as Harry
Brandon Chambers as Tyrese	Chris Reynolds as Freddy
Tomas Ferris as Charlie	Stephen Mitchell as George

== Production ==
The film was first announced in August 2008, when it was announced Martin Freeman would star. Principal photography began in the same month.

== Reception ==
=== Box office ===
When released in the United Kingdom, the movie opened at #5, taking £794,315 at the box office in the United Kingdom. In its third week, the movie rose to #4, and in the end, made £5,187,402.

=== Critical response ===
On the review aggregator website Rotten Tomatoes, 48% of 29 critics' reviews are positive, with an average rating of 4.9/10.

== Sequels ==
- Nativity 2: Danger in the Manger
- Nativity 3: Dude, Where's My Donkey?
- Nativity Rocks!

== Stage musical ==
A stage musical adaptation of the film, also written and directed by Debbie Isitt and composed by Nicky Ager, opened at the Birmingham Repertory Theatre in October 2017. Since its world premiere, the musical has toured the UK over the Christmas seasons, including runs at London's Hammersmith Apollo, which have featured guest star celebrities such as Louis Walsh, Danny Dyer, Dani Dyer, Jo Brand, Rylan Clark and Sharon Osbourne.

== See also ==
- List of Christmas films
