= Archduke (disambiguation) =

Archduke was the title borne by rulers of the Archduchy of Austria, and later by other members of the Habsburg family.

Archduke may also refer to:

- Archduke (butterfly), a genus of butterflies
- Archduke (horse), a racehorse
- Archduke Trio, a piano trio by Ludwig van Beethoven
- Archduke, a 2017 play by Rajiv Joseph

== See also ==
- List of rulers of Austria
