= Confetti (2006 film) =

- Theatrical release poster
- Directed by: Debbie Isitt
- Written by: Debbie Isitt
- Produced by: Nick Jones; Ian Benson; Ian Flooks; May Chu
- Starring: Jimmy Carr; Felicity Montagu; Jessica Stevenson; Martin Freeman; Olivia Colman; Meredith MacNeill; Stephen Mangan; Robert Webb
- Cinematography: Dewald Aukema
- Edited by: Nicky Ager
- Music by: Paul Englishby
- Production company: BBC Films
- Distributed by: Fox Searchlight Pictures
- Release date: 5 May 2006
- Running time: 100 minutes
- Country: United Kingdom
- Language: English
- Box office: $4,903,131

Confetti is a 2006 British mockumentary romantic comedy film released on 5 May 2006. It was conceived and directed by Debbie Isitt and stars many acclaimed British comedians, including Jessica Stevenson, Jimmy Carr, Martin Freeman, Mark Heap, Julia Davis, Robert Webb and Olivia Colman. It follows a bridal magazine competition for the most original wedding, the ultimate prize being a house, and the three couples who are chosen to compete. The film follows the contestants in a fly-on-the-wall documentary style, akin to The Office. The script was entirely improvised. The film was a box office success, grossing $4.9 million on a budget of $2 million.

== Plot ==
The prestigious bridal magazine Confetti, owned by the arrogant, suave Antoni Clarke and managed by the long-suffering, uptight chief editor Vivienne, is holding a competition to see who can hold the most original wedding, with the winners being presented with a new house and a cover shoot for the magazine. Three couples and their proposals are selected to participate: Sam and Matt, a middle class couple of old-fashioned romantics who have elected to hold their wedding in the style of Busby Berkeley musicals of the 1930s and 1940s, despite the fact that Sam can barely hold a tune; Isabelle and Josef, a pair of hyper-competitive professional tennis players holding a tennis-themed wedding; and Joanna and Michael, a naturist couple who intend to hold their wedding entirely naked. All three weddings are planned using the services of Gregory and Archie, wedding planners and partners in both business and love.

The film follows their planning, and the various crises that each couple faces over the three-month planning period. As well as learning to sing and dance, Sam and Matt must contend with Sam's dominating mother and attention-seeking sister, who appear intent on hijacking the proceedings and constantly browbeat and undermine the shy and easily cowed Sam such as preventing her from inviting her beloved but estranged Sam's father, much to Matt's growing irritation. The couple must also deal with Matt's oldest friend and best man Snoopy, a musician who nurses a bitter resentment towards Sam for coming between him and Matt that he expresses in not-so-subtle lyrics that he intends to sing at the wedding. Despite the constant support and encouragement the couple receive from Archie and Gregory, the gradual tension eventually builds to a bitter argument between Matt and Sam's mother and sister which sees him kicked out of the house where he is staying with them; this prompts Sam, however, to finally stand up for herself and put her mother and sister in place.

Isabelle and Josef, meanwhile, are intensely determined to win, owing to unexplained financial difficulties. Suspicious and competitive, they become increasingly paranoid that the competition is being 'fixed' against them in favour of Matt and Sam, eventually resorting to the extreme measure of having Isabelle's nose – and her extremely large nostrils – altered by plastic surgery (with the result being that the nose she ends up with is much longer than her original one). In the process, however, they find themselves combating their own anxieties; Josef, in particular, finds himself confronting his jealousy over Isabelle's friendship with their tennis coach, Jesus, and insecurity over his largely finished tennis career and that he will not be able to be a worthy husband to Isabelle. Joanna and Michael, however, find their plans challenged at every turn by Vivienne, who has no intention of putting a naked couple on the front of the magazine should they win. Michael, an experienced naturist, angrily resists Vivienne's efforts to make him dress up for the wedding, but Joanna, a recent convert and still insecure about revealing her body to strangers, finds herself of mixed minds about the issue. The pressure of the magazine and the tension between the two becomes so great that it briefly looks like the marriage will not even take place at all.

The big day finally arrives, amid much jitters and anxiety on all sides. All three weddings go off largely without a hitch, although Michael and Joanna raise eyebrows when, in defiance of Vivienne's rulings, they bare all (literally) in their wedding service. The winners are soon decided – Matt and Sam, which prompts a display of sour grapes from both Josef and Isabelle. The movie then briefly glimpses at the three couples a few months later, all of whom are adjusting to married life relatively happily.

== Cast ==
- Jimmy Carr as Antoni Clarke
- Felicity Montagu as Vivien
- Jessica Hynes as Sam
- Martin Freeman as Matt
- Meredith MacNeill as Isabelle
- Stephen Mangan as Josef
- Olivia Colman as Joanna
- Robert Webb as Michael
- Vincent Franklin as Archie
- Jason Watkins as Gregory
- Marc Wootton as Snoopy
- Alison Steadman as Sam's mother
- Sarah Hadland as Jen, Sam's sister
- Ron Cook as Sam's father
- Selina Cadell as Joanna's mother
- Jesús de Miguel as Tennis coach
- Julia Davis as Marriage counselor
- Mark Heap as Registrar
- Nickolas Grace as Judge
- Kate Smallwood as Sophie

== Production ==
One of the three couples whose story is followed opts for a naturist wedding. Spielplatz in Hertfordshire was used as the location for the naturist village Summerland.

== Reception ==
=== Critical Response ===
On the review aggregator website Rotten Tomatoes, 57% of 74 critics' reviews are positive, with an average rating of 5.8/10. On Metacritic, the film has a weighted average score of 57 out of 100, based on 21 critics, indicating "mixed or average" reviews.

== Controversy ==
Both Robert Webb and Olivia Colman publicly criticized the film, with Webb saying, "I had a miserable time making it and I think the finished film is an underwhelming mess." Colman claimed she had been misinformed about the amount of nudity involved in the film. Webb claimed, on The Graham Norton Show, that the director had informed him that his genitals would all be pixelated in the final film and was not aware until the screening that this was not the case. In an interview with The Guardian, Colman described the film as "a fucking turkey", "horrible" and the "worst experience of my life". She relays how she felt "betrayed" by the film-makers who had misled her about how much of her body would be seen in the final edit and has since found it hard to trust people, saying: "I now know there are some people who are just bad." Colman and Webb started legal proceedings against the film-makers, but these were eventually abandoned when the actors concluded it was too late and the lengthy process would prevent them from "pretending it didn't happen".

== Home media ==
The bonus features on the DVD include three alternative endings: one ending for each of the "losing" couples as well as an extra ending for Matt and Sam.
