= Mein neuer Freund =

- Starring: Christian Ulmen
- Country of origin: Germany

Original release
- Release: January 18, 2005

Mein neuer Freund (My New Friend) was a German reality television show which aired on ProSieben in 2005. The series was a German adaptation of the British comedy My New Best Friend.

The host of the show was Christian Ulmen, who also played the "new best friend".

== Concept ==
Contestants were required to spend an entire weekend with someone they did not know, someone unpleasant and irritating to them, played by Christian Ulmen in disguise. The contestants did not know this person's identity or characteristics in advance. They had to endure everything the person did or demanded, and introduce him to their friends and parents as their new friend.

The contestant and their "new friend" were the only people who knew that everything was being filmed and that the relationship was staged. The contestant could opt out at any time.

If the contestant endured the friend's constant provocations, they could win a prize of €10,000. When this happened, the "new friend" handed over the money under a pretext and then left the room.

== Episodes ==
=== Knut ===
Unkempt entertainer Knut Hansen is the only one who recognizes his own talent. Contestant Diana (26) endures his stench and performances to the end.

=== Uwe ===
Clumsy mother's boy Uwe Woellner annoys Anika (26) with an allergy to just about anything. She can't stand him, and opts out for this reason.

=== Alexander ===
Contestant Franziska (24) doesn't let herself get worked up by the rich, misanthropic snot Alexander von Eich and wins the money.

=== Veith ===
Therapist and motivational speaker Veith tries to turn André (30) homosexual, but the contestant survives the episode.

=== Ecke ===
Good-for-nothing, drug-addicted rapper Ecke first insults contestant Sabine's (26) friend in a Bob Marley outfit, then he wants to see her mother. Sabine gives in.

=== Collin ===
Schizophrenic American Collin Brown believes in aliens. Back on planet earth, contestant Yvonne (27) wins €10,000.

=== Jürgen ===
Working-class petty criminal Jürgen Wegmann presents the father of contestant Sandra (28) with a business idea for a telephone sex operation, and gives her €10,000 at the end.

=== Martina ===
Contestant Christoph must present transgender nag Martina Kandel to his parents as a former school friend and is rewarded with the prize.

=== Marcel ===
This overexcited man with a bobble hat is always trying to seem cool. Contestant Mike ends the game when Marcel addresses his mother. (This episode was not broadcast and only appeared on DVD).

== TV Ratings ==
The show's host channel removed the program from its listing because the first episode of the series did not match ProSieben's desired market.

In response to a fan-initiated internet petition, ProSieben returned the series to broadcast at short notice, during their 11:15 P.M. slot.

Although the later episodes had a larger viewership than the pilot, the ratings were still below the network's target.

== Re-runs ==
On November 1, 2005, reruns of the entire season of Mein neuer Freund were shown on MTV Germany. Another repeat ran in early 2008 on Comedy Central. In a final special episode, Christian Ulmen commented on the individual characters and contestants.

== ulmen.tv ==
The roles Alexander Von Eich, Knut Hansen, Uwe Wöllner and, since the eleventh of December, also Ecke, now called Maurice Horstmann, have been incorporated into ulmen.tv, the show's successor.

In ulmen.tv, there are no contestants who spend a weekend with the characters. Unlike Mein neuer Freund, ulmen.tv was first shown only on the internet from the end of August 2008, and could be seen at 3min.de. Since October 2012 all episodes of ulmen.tv have been shown on Tele 5.

Later, selected episodes of ulmen.tv were also broadcast on Comedy Central and MTV.

== Internet and DVD ==
All episodes that were broadcast on television were made available in full length on MySpass.de free of charge.

In addition, a DVD has been released which includes a special never before broadcast episode.

== See also ==
- List of German television series
