= Cyderdelic =

BBC Three spoof documentary

Cyderdelic is a BBC Three spoof documentary following the activities of a 'West Country direct action group within the growing anti-capitalist movement'. It was subtitled 'The Revolution Will Be Televised'.

Cyderdelic was narrated by John Peel and starred Barry Castagnola (Beetle), Marc Wootton (Su Long), and Liam Woodman (Frogger), and followed the trio over two months as they traveled from the May Day demonstrations to the sunrise celebrations at Stonehenge. The lads spread their philosophy – 'overthrow capitalism and replace it with something nicer', 'cut the traffic, not the trees' and 'most women and foreigners can be as good as men'.

== Awards ==
Cyderdelic was shortlisted for the 2001 Perrier Award and in 2002 won the BBC Two Greenlight Award.

== Blasphemy ==
Cyderdelic was at the centre of a complaint of blasphemy after a viewer felt that a scene in the first series show 'Environmental' mocked the Crucifixion. The contentious scene showed spoof ecowarrior Su holding an art exhibition entitled 'England is Shit'.

The complaint centred on the depiction of the Cross ('one of the most central symbols of the Christian faith') covered in excrement. Later in the same scene one of the central characters stated repeatedly that 'Jesus Christ is a bell end.'

BBC Producers' Guidelines 6.8 and 6.9 state that "deep offence will be caused by profane references or disrespect, whether verbal or visual, directed at deities, scriptures, holy days and rituals which are at the heart of various religions." and that "the use of names [considered holy by believers, for example Jesus Christ or God] as expletives in drama or light entertainment causes distress far beyond their dramatic or humorous value."

However, the complaint was not upheld by the BBC Programme Complaints Unit, on the justification that the scenes mocked the "ludicrous pretensions of this pompous and self-regarding character" as well as the British modern art scene, that only a single complaint had been received, and that the show aired late at night on an 'experimental' channel.

The complainant however wrote to the BBC Governors, who decided to overrule the original decision and uphold the complaint. They concluded: "Members agreed with the complainant that the references about which he had complained were clearly in breach of the BBC Producers' Guidelines".

This decision was reported in national and international press, and had particular resonance following the decision not to show the Popetown cartoon series on the BBC.

The ruling was also brought back into public debate during the controversy over Jerry Springer – The Opera, and was one of the reference documents used by the BBC Governors when they debated whether Jerry Springer – The Opera was itself blasphemous.

The original decision of the Governors was to ban any repeat or sale of the offending episode, but following a campaign by Cyderdelic fans this position was softened and repeats and a DVD release were allowed with the contentious scene removed.

== DVD ==
A Cyderdelic DVD was released on 3 July 2006

- Cyderdelic DVD at Amazon.co.uk
