= High & Dry (2018 TV series) =

- Genre: Sitcom
- Created by: Marc Wootton
- Based on: Based on a Channel 4 online Blap
- Written by: Marc Wootton
- Directed by: Dave Lambert
- Starring: Marc Wootton; Harry Peacock; Asim Chaudhry; Vicki Pepperdine; Grace Rex
- Theme music composer: Sam Hooper
- Country of origin: United Kingdom
- Original language: English
- No. of seasons: 1
- No. of episodes: 6

Production
- Executive producers: Steve Coogan; Christine Langan; Paul Schlesinger; Marc Wootton
- Producers: Dave Lambert; Kerry Waddell
- Production location: Seychelles
- Cinematography: Pete Rowe
- Editor: Gareth Heal
- Running time: 26 minutes
- Production companies: Channel 4; Baby Cow Productions; Fooling Nobody

Original release
- Network: Channel 4
- Release: 4 May – 8 June 2018

High & Dry is a British television sitcom created by Marc Wootton for Channel 4. The series is about a plane crash in the Indian Ocean, where five people from the flight find themselves stranded together on a remote island. Although four of the survivors are desperate to be found and rescued, mentally unstable steward Brett Sullivan has other fantasies to play out. He secretly sabotages all attempts to escape the island but his madness becomes more apparent to the survivors over time.

== Development ==
Wootton has said that he came up with the character of Brett based on a real experience he had with a clingy air steward on a long-haul flight. The steward recognised him from TV and upgraded him to first class, but then spent the entire journey trying to befriend him and even asked for his phone number… which Marc gave to him with one digit changed. When they received a full commission, "Our producer Kerry Waddell started a global search (for locations having authenticity of an Indian Ocean paradise spot). The Seychelles rose to the top of the pack and in conjunction with a UK-based fixing firm, we travelled to recce and meet with the government officials to gain permission to shoot there". Filming, with assistance from the Seychelles Tourism Board, was held between 9 July and 4 August 2017, and was shot on location in Mahé, its main island.
