= No Offence =

British television drama, 2015–2018

- Genre: Police procedural Drama; Black comedy
- Created by: Paul Abbott
- Directed by: Catherine Morshead; David Kerr; Misha Manson-Smith; Harry Bradbeer
- Starring: Joanna Scanlan; Elaine Cassidy; Alexandra Roach; Paul Ritter; Will Mellor; Colin Salmon; Sarah Solemani; Saira Choudhry; Claire Rushbrook
- Theme music composer: Vince Pope
- Country of origin: United Kingdom
- Original language: English
- No. of seasons: 3
- No. of episodes: 21 (list of episodes)

Production
- Executive producers: Paul Abbott; Martin Carr; Paul Coe
- Producers: Anna Ferguson; Simon Meyers; Philip Leach
- Production location: Manchester
- Running time: 60 minutes
- Production company: AbbottVision

Original release
- Network: Channel 4
- Release: 5 May 2015 – 18 October 2018

No Offence is a British television police procedural drama on Channel 4, created by Paul Abbott. It follows a team of detectives from Friday Street police station, a division of the Manchester Metropolitan Police (a fictional version of the Greater Manchester Police). The series stars Joanna Scanlan as the protagonist, Detective Inspector Viv Deering. The first series focuses on the team's investigation into the serial murders of young girls with Down syndrome. It was renewed for two further runs. The second series of seven episodes began broadcasting on 4 January 2017, and follows the investigation into Manchester crime boss Nora Attah (Rakie Ayola). It was filmed on location in Manchester.

In the UK, the first episode of No Offence launched with 2.5 million viewers, Channel 4's biggest midweek drama launch for more than three years. Although subsequent episodes lost overnight viewers, dropping as low as 1.2 million, the weekly consolidated series average remained at 2.5 million and finished 47% up on Channel 4's slot average. In France, the first episode of No Offence aired on 29 February 2016 on France 2 and was watched by 5.46 million viewers, 20.4% of the TV audience. The next three episodes were shown back-to-back that evening and together achieved an average 4.6 million viewers, 19.3% of the TV audience.

A third series was confirmed in July 2017. Filming took place in Manchester in March 2018 and it began broadcasting on 13 September 2018. The six-episode series has a political focus, with the main storyline following the attempted murder of a local politician by a far right group. On 19 October 2018, Paul Abbott stated in an interview that he had begun working on ideas for a potential fourth series, but on 28 November 2019, Executive Producer Martin Carr confirmed on Twitter that the show would not be returning.

== Plot ==
In the first series, DI Viv Deering is introduced as the dynamic but blunt leader of a team of detectives at a fictional police station within the 'Manchester Metropolitan Police'. DC Dinah Kowalska misses out on promotion to DS after leaving the scene after an impetuous foot chase results in a death. She then uncovers a link between a murder, a drowning and a disappearance: someone is killing girls with Down syndrome. While negotiating different cases, the team must solve the case as more girls come into danger. The prime suspect is killed whilst fleeing arrest, but Dinah and Viv separately conclude that Viv's husband is also involved. Viv burns the evidence and plans to kill rather than arrest him, but he is killed by Cathy while she and Dinah are holding him at Viv's home. With Viv they cover up their involvement before the body is found.

The second series begins a little over a year later, as Viv returns after extended leave and attends a gang funeral, which is bombed despite the police presence.

== Cast ==
=== Main cast ===
- Joanna Scanlan as DI Vivenne Deering (Series 1–3)
- Elaine Cassidy as DC (Series 1–2) then DS Dinah Kowalska (Series 3)
- Alexandra Roach as DS Joy Freers (Series 1–3)
- Will Mellor as DC Spike Tanner (Series 1–3)
- Paul Ritter as Randolph Miller (Series 1–3)
- Colin Salmon as DSI Darren Maclaren (Series 1)
- Sarah Solemani as DCI Christine Lickberg (Series 2)
- Claire Rushbrook as DCI Marilyn Marchant (Series 3)
- Saira Choudhry as PC Tegan Thompson (Series 1–3)
- Tom Varey as PC Stuart O'Connell (Series 1–3)
- Ste Johnson as PC Jonah Mitchell (Series 1–3)
- Neet Mohan as PC Taz Ahmed (Series 1–2)

=== Recurring cast ===
- Charlie May-Clark as Cathy Calvert (Series 1–2)
- Claudia Adshead as Donna Calvert (Series 1–2)
- Kate O'Flynn as Dr Peep (Series 1–3)
- Conor MacNeill as Gavin (Series 2–3)
- Chook Sibtain as Sgt. Keith Pankani (Series 2)
- Risteárd Cooper as Laurie Gaskell (Series 1)
- Hanna Bieniuszewicz as Magda Kowalska (Series 1)
- Mia Blakeley as Tessa Kowalska (Series 1); Elizabeth Lomas as Tessa Kowalska (Series 3)
- Siobhán McSweeney as Ruth Cheetam (Series 1)
- Philip McGinley as Bob Simmons (Series 1)
- Ben Tavassoli as Alpha (Series 1)
- Daniel Ginty as Luke Hyatt (Series 1)
- Hannah Walters as Connie Ball (Series 1)
- Rakie Ayola as Nora Attah (Series 2)
- Zackary Momoh as Mani Attah (Series 2)
- Zak Sutcliffe as Kim Garvey (Series 2)
- Felix Scott as DS Ewan Murray (Series 2)
- Phil Dunster as Detective Chief Inspector Tom Pembroke (Series 3)
- Lisa McGrillis as Caroline McCoy (Series 3)
- Neil Maskell as Dennis Caddy (Series 3)
- Sharon Rooney as Faye Caddy (Series 3)
- Tamara Lawrance as Bonnie Sands (Series 3)
- Nigel Lindsay as Detective Chief Inspector Terry Taylor (Series 3)

== Characters ==
=== Main ===
- Detective Inspector Vivenne Deering (Joanna Scanlan) is a cast-iron cop with a tough-love approach to managing her team. She is at the prime of her life and capable in her job. However, with a high-flying career comes a disintegrating home life.
- Detective Constable / Detective Sergeant Dinah Kowalska (Elaine Cassidy) is a strong yet impulsive member of the team. She is passed over for a promotion to sergeant following a stupid mistake, and it's not long before she makes another move in following her emotions, which threatens her job. She lives with her eccentric Polish mother Magda and her teenage daughter Tessa.
- Detective Sergeant Joy Freers (Alexandra Roach) is an equally brilliant detective but one who is shy of the spotlight. Her promotion to sergeant ahead of Dinah removes her from her comfort zone; if only she recognised her own brilliance behind her anxiety.
- Detective Constable Spike Tanner (Will Mellor) is a risk-taking headstrong man amongst the powerful women of the group. He provides emotional glue for the group, but he is also a cheeky fun-loving guy.
- Randolph Miller (Paul Ritter) is an eccentric in forensics, despite the team's general despair of his lacklustre attitude to the job. Often hungover, it's lucky Randolph's a maverick who's amazing at his job.
- Detective Superintendent Darren Maclaren (Colin Salmon) is the big boss who even Viv has to answer to. He is straight-talking but manipulative; he is the only man who can take on Viv, and even then she's more than a handful.
- Detective Chief Inspector Christine Lickberg (Sarah Solemani) is Viv's new boss in the second series. She's not afraid to question Viv's decisions, and does not intend to make friends of the team.
- Detective Chief Inspector Marilyn Marchant (Claire Rushbrook) is Viv's new boss in the third series, who provides both support to Viv and firm leadership depending on what the moment requires.
- PC Tegan Thompson (Saira Choudhry) is a tough and ambitious officer. She refuses to suffer fools and has a good relationship with her police partner Stuart; is there a hint of romance?
- PC Stuart O'Connell (Tom Varey) is a smart and switched-on policeman, and Tegan's partner. He aims to make sergeant, but he cannot get drawn into the trouble his colleagues like to indulge in.
- PC Jonah Mitchell (Ste Johnson) is overweight and mischievous, yet enthusiastic; he is Taz's partner.
- PC Taz Ahmed (Neet Mohan) is a happy-go-lucky yet calming influence on the team, and Jonah's partner.

=== Recurring ===
==== Multiple Series ====
- Cathy Calvert (Charlie May-Clark) is a young woman from a broken home who becomes a person of interest for the team after she becomes a target for a serial killer. She later stays with Dinah and her family, thus developing a familial bond with Dinah.
- Donna Calvert (Claudia Adshead) is Cathy's older sister and a former drug addict attempting to turn her life around. Her role as Nora Attah's hairdresser brings her into more professional contact with Viv's team in the second series.
- Dr Peep (Kate O'Flynn) is a longtime friend of Dinah's and consultant psychiatrist working with the police on cases requiring her psychological expertise.
- Tessa Kowalska (Mia Blakeley, Series 1 & Elizabeth Lomas, Series 3) is Dinah's teenage daughter and Magda's granddaughter.
- Gavin (Conor MacNeill) is a civilian support worker within Viv's unit, replacing Connie Ball from the second series onwards.

==== Series 1 ====
- Laurie Gaskell (Risteárd Cooper) is Viv's husband and an aspiring musician, who often takes issue with the hours required for Viv's job.
- Magda Kowalska (Hanna Bieniuszewicz) is Dinah's mother and Tessa's grandmother who lives with the family.
- Ruth Cheetham (Siobhán McSweeney) is a nurse at one of the local Accident & Emergency departments who occasionally comes into contact with the team and later dates Jonah.
- Patrick Llewellyn (Peter McDonald) is a social worker and community group leader for young people with Down's Syndrome who encounters Viv's unit during their investigation into a serial killer.
- Alpha (Ben Tavassoli) is the boyfriend of Cathy Calvert and the father of her child.
- Connie Ball (Hannah Walters) is a civilian support worker within Viv's unit, dealing with administrative matters relevant to their cases.

==== Series 2 ====
- Nora Attah (Rakie Ayola) is a major crime boss in Manchester, heading up the Nigerian crime syndicate that is in direct competition with the Irish Mob. Nora has also known Viv for a long time and the two are frequent opponents across the police/criminal divide.
- Manni Attah (Zackary Momoh) is Nora's son and a senior figure in her crime syndicate. Manni harbours hopes of succeeding Nora, even as his mother frequently takes issue with his decisions and instincts.
- Kim Garvey (Zak Sutcliffe) is a young offender and petty criminal with connections to the Attah family.
- Detective Sergeant Ewan Murray (Felix Scott) is an officer within the Child Protection Unit, who becomes involved with Viv's unit when they come across a case of child exploitation connected to the Attah family.
- Sergeant Keith Pankani (Chook Sibtain) is the officer in charge of the custody suite within the police station where Viv's unit is based.
- Aidan McGee (Jody Latham) is a war veteran and former criminal attempting to set his life on the right course whilst dealing with a recent bereavement, a case that is the subject of an investigation by Viv's unit.

==== Series 3 ====
- Detective Chief Inspector Tom Pembroke (Phil Dunster) is a member of Special Branch who clashes with Viv when her investigation into the assassination attempt on Caroline McCoy conflicts with an undercover Special Branch inquiry into Albion.
- Caroline McCoy (Lisa McGrillis) is a local businesswoman and longtime family friend of Viv, who knew Caroline's mother. Caroline is running for Mayor of Greater Manchester as an independent candidate, pledging to bring communities together, which causes her to face an assassination attempt.
- Dennis Caddy (Neil Maskell) is the leader of Albion, a local extreme far-right group based in Manchester, who is well known to the police.
- Faye Caddy (Sharon Rooney) is the younger sister of Dennis Caddy and deputy leader of Albion, supporting her brother's far-right political efforts.
- Bonnie Sands (Tamara Lawrance) is the girlfriend of Albion leader Dennis Caddy and raises suspicion from Viv's unit at the start of their investigation into the assassination attempt on McCoy.
- Kashif Hassan (Ace Bhatti) is the incumbent Mayor of Greater Manchester and running for re-election against a field of candidates that includes Caroline McCoy.
- Lionel Durkin (Patrick Baladi) is the owner of Pellinore, a private security company with interests all across Manchester. Durkin also runs several charities on behalf of war veterans whilst financially supporting Albion at the same time.
- Detective Chief Inspector Terry Taylor (Nigel Lindsay) is a zealous, politically motivated senior officer allied with Caroline McCoy and who clashes with Viv when appointed as her superior.

== Episode list ==
Series	Episodes	Originally aired	Average ratings (millions)	DVD/Blu-ray release date			
Series	Episodes	Originally aired	Average ratings (millions)	Region 1	Region 2	Region 3	Region 4
1	8	5 May 2015	2.53	—N/a	10 August 2015	—N/a	6 April 2016
2	7	4 January 2017	2.69	—N/a	—N/a	—N/a	—N/a
3	6	13 September 2018	2.43	—N/a	—N/a	—N/a	—N/a

=== Series 1 (2015) ===
No. overall	No. in season	Title	Directed by	Written by	Original release date	UK viewers (millions)
1	1	"Episode 1"	Catherine Morshead & David Kerr	Paul Abbott	5 May 2015	3.93
Dinah catches sight of a robbery suspect on her way home from a night out, but when she chases him into the path of a double decker bus, her candidacy for promotion to sergeant is thrown into question. Meanwhile, two young girls with Down's syndrome have been murdered, and a third young girl is missing. Dinah notices a link between the cases, and it's not long before the team find themselves running out of time to find the latest victim before the killer strikes again.
2	2	"Episode 2"	David Kerr & Catherine Morshead	Paul Abbott	12 May 2015	2.97
As Dinah helps the victim Cathy Calvert, Viv and the team feel the force of the repercussions as the case is handed over to McLaren's team. Meanwhile, Joy's first case as sergeant leads her and Spike onto the trail of a deadly drug that has already claimed the lives of three victims. Using a rather underhand tactic, they manage to stake-out the location of the drug factory before securing the evidence they need to arrest their prime suspect.
3	3	"Episode 3"	Catherine Morshead	Paul Tomalin	19 May 2015	2.42
Convinced that the serial killer will strike again soon, Dinah uses a fresh lead as bait to try and tempt the killer. Meanwhile, Joy and Spike deal with a fatal arson attack on the home of an Asian woman. As they arrest their prime suspect in the middle of his wedding reception, they begin to realise that they may have the wrong man, and that victim's husband may be responsible for the attack.
4	4	"Episode 4"	Misha Manson-Smith	Jack Lothian	26 May 2015	2.25
A fourth victim is kidnapped by the serial killer, and Dinah and Viv enlist the help of the young girl's best friend to decode secret messages in her diary between her and the killer. Meanwhile, Jonah and Taz have the painful job of telling the mother of a suicide victim of his death, but their visit to the victim's home leads them to find the man's wife dead and puts them onto the trail of a secret underground operating theatre where an illegal trade in black market organs is taking place.
5	5	"Episode 5"	Catherine Morshead	Paul Abbott & Jimmy Dowdall	2 June 2015	2.29
After making online contact with the killer, the team use a former victim's best friend as bait, in the hope that the killer will show his face. Meanwhile, Spike has to deal with an angry mob who have assaulted a travel agent. However, when Spike discovers that the victim is a former child murderer, whose identity has been changed, his level of compassion begins to decline.
6	6	"Episode 6"	Misha Manson-Smith	Mark Greig	9 June 2015	2.24
Having secured evidence against prime suspect Patrick Llewellyn, the team organise a raid on his house, but the ensuing chase ends in tragedy when he is killed in a collision with a lorry. A search of his flat fails to yield any clues, until Cathy claims that her attacker had an accomplice - and Dinah and Viv soon suspect that the second man may be one of the team. Meanwhile, Joy and Spike investigate a slavery case where a young boy who tried to escape has been left with serious injuries.
7	7	"Episode 7"	Harry Bradbeer	Paul Tomalin	16 June 2015	2.09
Viv sets Dinah the task of eliminating each member of the team as the possible accomplice, but both soon find evidence which points to the most unlikely suspect of all. Viv faces a personal dilemma of whether to confront the killer or bury the evidence. Meanwhile, Joy and Spike investigate the brutal shooting of a surgeon. They soon discover that a young schoolgirl is responsible, and try to prove that her teacher, and inspiration, coached her into doing so.
8	8	"Episode 8"	Harry Bradbeer	Paul Abbott	23 June 2015	2.04
Dinah and Viv clash over her personal struggle to confront the killer, who is Viv's husband. Jonah faces disciplinary action after his attempt to save a mother and baby goes badly wrong. Viv plans to kill her husband but while she is away Dinah and Cathy kill him and cover their tracks.

=== Series 2 (2017) ===
No. overall	No. in season	Title	Directed by	Written by	Original release date	UK viewers (millions)
9	1	"Episode 1"	Catherine Morshead	Paul Abbott	4 January 2017	3.58
At the funeral of her son, crime boss Nora Attah, who is under the close eye of the Friday Street team, is targeted by a bomber, who detonates an explosion outside the crematorium during the service. This leads the team to discover a number of identified bodies buried in a mass grave outside the crematorium, leading to the owners being arrested and brought in for questioning. The Kennedy family are suspected of being responsible for the attack, and Nora's arch rival, Jackie, is questioned. Later, Nora arranges for a revenge attack, and recruits tearaway Kim Garvey to break into the hospital where Jackie's father Earl is being treated and murder him.
10	2	"Episode 2"	Catherine Morshead	Paul Tomalin	11 January 2017	2.52
Earl Kennedy's murder sparks a series of riot attacks across Manchester, with Nora's businesses and homes being the prime targets. Dinah and Jonah are out on patrol when they come under fire from a group of rioters. When Dinah arrives at the scene of a vape shop that has been firebombed, she enters to try and save a family trapped in the flat above. Whilst inside, she discovers a padlocked room in which a group of teenagers are trapped. She is unable to access the room and the five youngsters subsequently suffocate to death. Meanwhile, Joy questions a looter, but is shocked when the young teen unexpectedly takes her own life whilst in custody.
11	3	"Episode 3"	Sarah O'Gorman	Mark Greig & Paul Tomalin	18 January 2017	2.49
Viv and Spike interrogate Nora in an attempt to find a chink in her armour, but a lack of result leads Viv to call upon Dr Peep for help. Meanwhile, Tegan and Jonah are called to an armed robbery at a pub. Jonah manages to disarm the suspect, but when he collapses of a suspected heart attack, the on-scene paramedic orders Jonah to use his stun gun to restart his heart. Jonah is delighted until he discovers that the man is not actually a paramedic - and that he has been guilty of a string of confidence tricking offences involving elderly victims. As Joy prepares for her Independent Police Complaints Commission interview, Viv and Dinah confront Manni with some potentially life-changing evidence that Miller has discovered.
12	4	"Episode 4"	Sarah O'Gorman	Jimmy Dowdall	25 January 2017	2.50
As Viv continues her pursuit of Manni, Dinah continues to dig into Ewan's past and uncovers a trail of children taken from seemingly suitable care homes and placed into the hands of Nora. Joy initially refuses to believe that her new beau is as corrupt as Dinah and Viv choose to believe, but her own suspicions soon begin to grow. Meanwhile, a fourteen year old girl disappears on her way home from school, and Miller discovers a history of chatroom interaction with suspected paedophiles. A tip-off leads the team to search the victim's garage, where they find disguised blood stains, but none turn out to belong to the missing girl. Viv and Dinah decide to trail Ewan.
13	5	"Episode 5"	Samira Radsi	Paul Abbott	1 February 2017	2.65
Following Ewan's death, the team begin to trawl through his case files and discover that he was the case officer for a fourteen-year-old boy in care who disappeared four weeks ago. When video footage found on Ewan's computer suggests that the boy was raped by Mani, Viv decides to strike a deal with Donna Calvert in an attempt to get inside Nora's world. Dinah is called to a dispute between an abortion care provider and her medical staff, but the abortion care provider’s husband dies suddenly from a heart attack. Whilst driving and using her mobile phone, Viv is involved in a minor car accident, unaware that this has been staged by Nora to get her suspended.
14	6	"Episode 6"	Samira Radsi	Paul Tomalin	8 February 2017	2.52
Suspended from duty, Viv does her best to continue investigating the Attah case. Following a tip off from Donna, she tracks Mani to a first floor flat above a Chinese restaurant, and unexpectedly comes across the missing body of Roland Berry. Spike finally manages to get Kim Garvey to open up to him. Joy attempts to lure Nora into a deal by offering to investigate a surgeon who is allegedly carrying out FGM on young girls, and decides to send Tegan undercover to catch the perpetrator in the act. The allegations against Viv are withdrawn, allowing her to resume her job. Dinah discovers that Viv and Joy have been using Donna as a mole.
15	7	"Episode 7"	Robert Quinn	Paul Abbott	15 February 2017	2.56
The team put themselves on the line in an attempt to bring down the Attahs once and for all. Joy makes a case changing discovery and Donna poses a significant threat to the Friday Street building. Things come to an end on a field with a helicopter and a gun.

=== Series 3 (2018) ===
No. overall	No. in season	Title	Directed by	Written by	Original release date	UK viewers (millions)
16	1	"Episode 1"	Catherine Morshead	Paul Tomalin	13 September 2018	2.51
The attempted murder of mayoral candidate Caroline McCoy turns tragic when Joy is gunned down in the line of duty. Hellbent on revenge, Viv and her team close in on a right-wing group – but find themselves blocked by one of their own.
17	2	"Episode 2"	Robert Quinn	Paul Tomalin	20 September 2018	2.38
Joy's killer creates chaos in Manchester when he claims to have poisoned a batch of Halal meat. Dinah – newly promoted to sergeant – confronts undercover cop Bonnie Sands, and learns there is a more complex reason to why she has turned her back on the police.
18	3	"Episode 3"	Catherine Morshead	Paul Abbott	27 September 2018	2.48
Election day looms and the team is on high alert, as Beckett's reign of terror appears to be escalating when an elderly Jewish man is found dead in a graveyard. The team is right on Beckett's tail, and a meeting between getaway driver Dennis and Beckett promises to be the key to capturing him.
19	4	"Episode 4"	Robert Quinn	Tom Grieves	4 October 2018	2.37
The team have 48 hours to get Dennis to betray his best friend and turn police informant. When Viv tunnels down to Dennis's deepest insecurities she unleashes more than she could have bargained for.
20	5	"Episode 5"	Misha Manson-Smith	Julie Rutterford	11 October 2018	2.44
Caroline McCoy's political reign brings chaos to the streets of Manchester, and catapults hardline DCI Terry Taylor into Friday Street cop shop, to bring the police in line with her agenda.
21	6	"Episode 6"	Misha Manson-Smith	Paul Abbott	18 October 2018	2.38
The team are running out of options and their strategy is threatened when one of their own is placed in peril.

== Reception ==
=== Awards and nominations ===
Year	Association	Category	Nominee(s)	Result
2015	Festival de la fiction TV de La Rochelle	Best Foreign Fiction	No Offence	Won
2015	RTS Craft & Design Awards	Best Music, Original Titles	Vince Pope	Nominated
2016	BAFTA Television Awards	Best Drama Series	No Offence	Nominated
2016	Broadcast Awards	Best Drama Series or Serial	No Offence	Nominated
2016	Broadcast Awards	Best Original Programme	No Offence	Nominated
2016	Irish Film and Television Awards	Best Actress in a Lead Role - Drama	Elaine Cassidy	Nominated
2016	RTS Programme Awards	Best Drama Series	No Offence	Won
2017	Irish Film and Television Awards	Best Actress in a Lead Role - Drama	Elaine Cassidy	Nominated

== DVD ==
The complete Series One and Two were released on 10 August 2015, as well as a boxset containing both series. The complete Series Three was released on 22 October 2018, along with a complete collection containing all three series.
