= Catherine Morshead =

British TV director

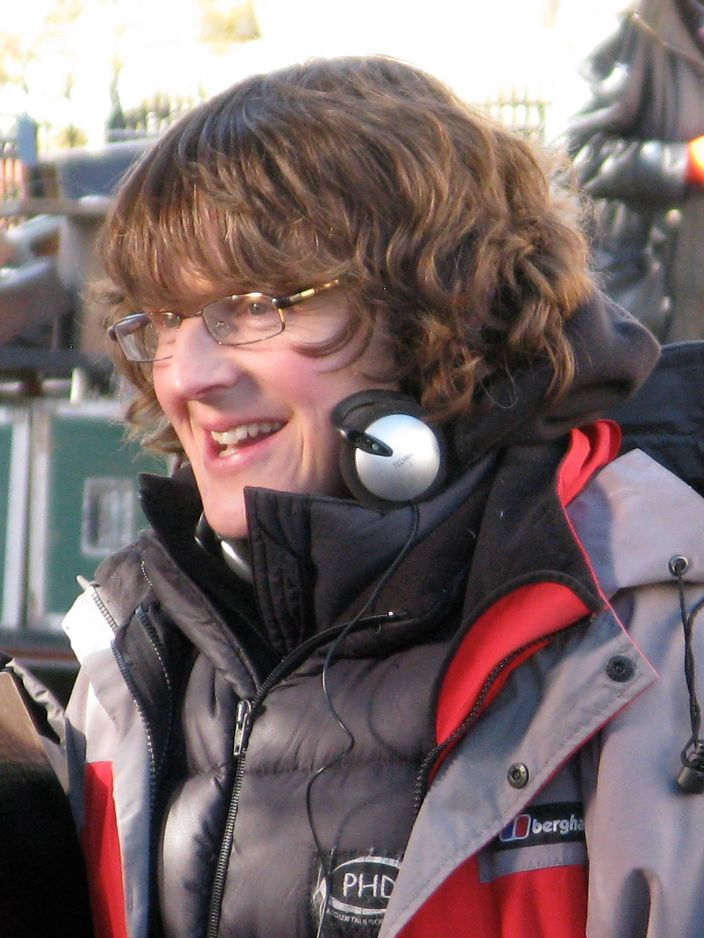
- Catherine Morshead in March 2010

Catherine Morshead is a British TV director. She started her career in 1990 when she directed a show called Science Fiction, and in that same year she directed an episode of the ITV soap opera Emmerdale Farm. In 2008 she directed various episodes of the BBC One show Ashes to Ashes. In 2010 she directed two episodes of the fifth series of the revived Doctor Who series; the episodes are titled "Amy's Choice" and "The Lodger". In 2015 she directed the series adaption of Fungus the Bogeyman, which aired on Christmas 2015.

== Director credits ==
Production	Notes	Broadcaster
Emmerdale	7 episodes (1990)	ITV
Haggard	3 episodes (1992)	ITV
Heartbeat	5 episodes (1993–1994)	ITV
Dangerfield	"The Call Girl" (1995)	BBC
Casualty	"Crossing the Line" (1994); "Money for Nothing" (1995); "Subject to Contract" (1996)	BBC
Soldier Soldier	"Walking on Air" (1996)	ITV
Silent Witness	"Cease Upon the Midnight: Part 1" (1997); "Cease Upon the Midnight: Part 2" (1997)	BBC
The Bill	6 episodes (1995–1998)	ITV
Playing the Field	3 episodes (1998)	BBC
The Passion	3 episodes (1999)	BBC
Masterpiece Classic	"The Railway Children" (2000)	PBS
A Christmas Carol	Television film (2000)	ITV
Me & Mrs Jones	Television film (2002)	PBS
Cutting It	4 episodes (2002–2004)	BBC
Life Begins	"Maggie & Phil" (2004)	ITV
Shameless	3 episodes (2006)	Channel 4
Viva Blackpool	Television film (2006)	BBC
The Amazing Mrs Pritchard	2 episodes (2006)	BBC
Fairy Tales	"Rapunzel" (2008)	BBC
Mutual Friends	4 episodes (2008)	BBC
Ashes to Ashes	6 episodes (2008–2009)	BBC
Murderland	"Carrie's Story" (2009); "Hain's Story" (2009); "Carol's Story" (2009)	ITV
Doctor Who	"Amy's Choice" (2010); "The Lodger" (2010)	BBC
The Great Outdoors	3 episodes (2010)	BBC
Silk	2 episodes (2011)	BBC
Threesome	Co-director 1 episodes (2011)	Comedy Central
Lapland	Television film (2011)	BBC
Above Suspicion	"Silent Scream Parts 1–3" (2012)	ITV
The Hour	2 episodes (2012)	BBC
Way to Go	"The Be All & End All" (2013); "The Bitter End" (2013); "The End of the Beginning" (2013)	BBC
Two Doors Down	Television film (2013)	BBC
Downton Abbey	5 episodes (2013–14)	ITV
Fungus the Bogeyman	3 episodes (2015)	SKY UK
No Offence	8 episodes (2015–2018)	Channel 4
’’Resistance’’	1 episode (2019)	RTÉ
’’Four Weddings And a Funeral’’	3 episodes (2019)	Hulu
Lockwood & Co.	3 episodes (2023)	Netflix
