= Nativity (film series) =

English film series

Nativity!
- Cover of the DVD collection of all 4 films in the series
- Directed by: Debbie Isitt
- Written by: Debbie Isitt
- Produced by: Nick Jones
- Starring: Martin Freeman (1); David Tennant (2); Martin Clunes (3); Daniel Boys (4); Marc Wootton (1-3); Simon Lipkin (3-4); Pam Ferris (1-2); Celia Imrie (3-4); Jason Watkins (1-3); Craig Revel Horwood (4)
- Edited by: Nicky Ager
- Music by: Nicky Ager; Debbie Isitt
- Production companies: Mirrorball Films; BBC Films (1); Screen WM (1); Moviehouse (2); Media Pro Six (2); Premiere Picture (2)
- Distributed by: BBC Films; Freestyle Digital Media (1); Entertainment One (2-4)
- Running time: 119 minutes
- Country: United Kingdom
- Language: English
- Budget: £6.1 million
- Box office: £34.2 million

Nativity is a film series of British independent Christmas family comedy films written and directed by Debbie Isitt, produced by Mirrorball Films and Nick Jones and distributed by Entertainment One.

== Films ==
=== Released films ===
==== Nativity! (2009) ====
Paul Maddens is a primary school teacher who once had ambitions of being successful as an actor, producer or director. Every year St Bernadette's Primary School in Coventry, where he teaches, competes with a local private school.

Despite this, St Bernadette's headteacher Mrs Bevans tasks him with running their nativity play this year and gives him a new class teaching assistant called Mr Poppy, who turns out to be as much of a child as the rest of Paul's class. As every year, it is one of Paul's other friends from drama school, Gordon Shakespeare, who runs the nativity plays at rival school Oakmoor.

Determined not to be seen as a failure by his old rival, Paul lies to Shakespeare about how a Hollywood producer, their old friend Jennifer, will be turning his production into a Hollywood film, though he has not even spoken to her in five years. Mr Poppy accidentally overhears this and is so excited that he has to spread the rumour. He proceeds to tell the class, which soon spreads to the entire school, and then the town. Paul does not notice any of the headlines about this on his way to work.

Soon, Paul finds his lie is out of control, and all he can do is go along with it as media attention mounts and the children get more and more excited, so Paul has to try to actually get Hollywood to turn their production into a film.

==== Danger in the Manger (2012) ====
Donald Peterson is an anxious teacher who has just moved to a new house with his pregnant wife Sarah. He accepts a teaching job at St. Bernadette's Primary School, taking over the class formerly taught by Mr Maddens, who by this point has left for the United States. In the interim, the enthusiastic and childlike teaching assistant Mr Poppy has been teaching the class unaided.

The class wants to enter a competition called "A Song for Christmas", in which each school produces a Christmas song, with the winning song earning its school £10,000 and the chance at being a Christmas #1. However, headteacher Mrs Bevan refuses the class permission to enter without a qualified teacher and worries that Mr Poppy's behaviour is so inappropriate that no teacher will stay on the job.

When Mr Poppy decides St Bernadette's should enter the National 'Song for Christmas' competition, he persuades Donald to sign the entry forms, later kidnapping him for an impromptu road trip to Castell Llawen ("Merry Castle", not a real place) in Wales, where the competition is being held.

==== Dude, Where's My Donkey? (2014) ====
This movie stars Martin Clunes, Marc Wootton and Catherine Tate, with Celia Imrie and Jason Watkins.

At St. Bernadette's school, Mr Poppy and the kids sign up to do a Flashmob in a Flashmob competition hosted by the famous Flashmobber, Bradley Finch. The winning prize will be to go to New York to dance on the Empire States Building.

Jeremy Shepherd is a super teacher (as Desmond Poppy thinks he is) who is the father of Lauren and is due to marry his fiancée Sophie in New York on Christmas Eve. However, Shepard is hit in the forehead by Mr Poppy's pet donkey Archie, and loses his memory.

As Shepard loses his memory, Lauren's wish was to make Shepard marry Sophie, so Mr Poppy and the kids help Lauren make her Christmas wish come true, by helping Shepard get his memory back by his Christmas past, getting to New York until Shepard takes a walk around New York.

==== Nativity Rocks! (2018) ====
It was confirmed on 4 December 2017 that Nativity 4 would be released on Friday 23 November 2018, and would be entitled Nativity Rocks!. A teaser trailer was released in July 2018. Casting included; Simon Lipkin, Daniel Boys, Craig Revel Horwood, Meera Syal, Helen George, Ruth Jones, Celia Imrie, Hugh Dennis, Anna Chancellor, Ramin Karimloo, as well as some of the cast from the original theatre musical cast.

Doru, a child refugee from Syria, is separated from his father as he arrives in the United Kingdom. He is moved to Coventry by social worker Miss Shelly and joins St Bernadette's Primary School, where he meets a new teaching assistant, Jerry Poppy, who assists him in his search for his father amid another Christmas musical production for the school, led by impresario Emmanuel Cavendish.

=== Future ===
In a 2015 interview with Feel Christmassy, before the release of Nativity Rocks!, Isitt stated that the fifth instalment in the series "has been developed" and that it would be set in Australia; she added, however, that she was "uncertain as to if or when [it] will be made". She also hinted on X in 2019 that she had a "Mr Poppy prequel ... on [her] slate". As of 2022, Coventry Telegraph said there had been "no [further] word on a potential fifth film".

==== Cancelled international remakes ====
Producer Nick Jones revealed that they had so far "politely declined" offers to make American and Australian remakes.

== Cast ==
Characters	Films			
Characters	Nativity!	Nativity 2: Danger in the Manger	Nativity 3: Dude, Where's My Donkey?	Nativity Rocks!
Characters	2009	2012	2014	2018
Desmond Poppy	Marc Wootton	Marc Wootton	Marc Wootton	Mentioned
Gordon Shakespeare	Jason Watkins	Jason Watkins	Jason Watkins	
Patricia Bevan	Pam Ferris	Pam Ferris	Photograph	Mentioned
Paul Maddens	Martin Freeman	Photographs	Photograph	
Jennifer Lore	Ashley Jensen			
The Mayor	Ricky Tomlinson			Vincent Franklin
Lucy Rye	Rosie Cavaliero	Rosie Cavaliero		
Donald Peterson		David Tennant	Photograph	
Roderick Peterson		David Tennant		
Mr Peterson Snr		Ian McNeice		
Angel Matthews		Jessica Hynes		Jessica Hynes
Sarah Peterson		Joanna Page		
Jeremy Shepherd			Martin Clunes	
Sophie O'Donnell			Catherine Tate	
Bradley Finch			Adam Garcia	
"Uncle Henry"			Stewart Wright	
Clara Keen			Celia Imrie	Celia Imrie
Jerry Poppy				Simon Lipkin
Emmanuel Cavendish				Craig Revel Horwood
Ben Johnson				Daniel Boys
Suzy Shelly				Helen George
Clara Hargreaves				Anna Chancellor
Robert Hargreaves				Hugh Dennis
Farmer Beatie				Ruth Jones

== Crew ==
Role	Films			
Role	Nativity!	Nativity 2: Danger in the Manger	Nativity 3: Dude, Where's My Donkey?	Nativity Rocks!
Director/writer	Debbie Isitt	Debbie Isitt	Debbie Isitt	Debbie Isitt
Producer	Nick Jones	Nick Jones	Nick Jones	Nick Jones
Executive producer(s)	Joe Oppenheimer; Lee Thomas; David M. Thompson	Laurence Brown; Jason Garrett; Alex Hamilton; Dan Lawson; Gary Phillips; David Rogers; Mark Vennis	Laurence Brown; Daniel Toland	Laurence Brown; Alexander Hamilton
Composer(s)	Nicky Ager; Debbie Isitt	Nicky Ager; Debbie Isitt	Nicky Ager; Debbie Isitt	Nicky Ager; Debbie Isitt
Editor	Nicky Ager	Nicky Ager	Nicky Ager	Nicky Ager
Release date	27 November 2009	23 November 2012	14 November 2014	23 November 2018

== Stage musical ==
A stage musical adaptation of the first film written and directed by Debbie Isitt and composed by Nicky Ager opened at the Birmingham Repertory Theatre in October 2017. Since its world premiere the musical has toured the UK over the Christmas seasons, including runs at London's Hammersmith Apollo which have featured guest star celebrities such as Louis Walsh, Danny Dyer, Dani Dyer, Jo Brand, Rylan Clark-Neal and Sharon Osbourne.

== Reception ==
=== Box office performance ===
Film	Release date	Box office gross			Budget	Ref.
Film	Release date	United Kingdom	Other territories	Worldwide	Budget	Ref.
Nativity	November 27, 2009	$8,412,353	$82,081	$8,494,434	$2,443,493	
Danger in the Manger	November 23, 2012	$14,433,981		$14,433,981	$3,657,136	
Dude, Where's My Donkey?	November 11, 2014	$11,283,866		$11,283,866		
Nativity Rocks	November 23, 2018	$4,129,456		$4,129,456		
Total		$38,259,656	$82,081	$38,341,737	$6,100,629	
List indicator: A dark grey cell indicates the information is not available for the film.

=== Critical Response ===
Film	Rotten Tomatoes
Nativity	48% (25 reviews)
Danger in the Manger	36% (22 reviews)
Dude, Where's My Donkey?	16% (19 reviews)
Nativity Rocks	0% (8 reviews)
