= Marc Wootton Exposed =

Television sketch comedy show

- Created by: Marc Wootton and Liam Woodman
- Starring: Marc Wootton
- Country of origin: United Kingdom
- No. of series: 1
- No. of episodes: 6

Production
- Camera setup: Multiple-camera
- Running time: 30 mins

Original release
- Network: BBC Three
- Release: 13 January – 25 February 2008

Marc Wootton Exposed is a television sketch comedy show, written by Marc Wootton and Liam Woodman, and starring character comedian Marc Wootton, who plays numerous in-depth characters with obscured humour situations in the form of monologues. The characters are introduced through the point of view of a photographer taking their pictures in a studio, and the show looks beyond the fake poses and into the life of the person beneath.

The series was filmed over late August 2007 and ran from 13 January 2008 to 25 February 2008 on BBC Three. The Song We are your friends by Justice V Simian features in the programme's opening and closing credits.

== Characters ==
- Doris, an elderly woman in her eighties whose tyrannical husband Des has recently died, setting her free from a life of misery; however, Doris cannot help but compare her newly found good times to her comically shocking times with her husband, with her trademark "When Des were around..."
- Paul Pearson, who claims that he has been bitten by a bat and is slowly turning into a vampire. Throughout the series, he charts his transformation "from human to a Dracula" through a series of video diaries, highlighting supposed changes in his nature.
- Rufus, an upper-class man who is pursuing a hip-hop music career; however, his lyrics seem to revolve more around pudding and gypsies than anything else.
- Stu, an Australian television presenter who hosts a show called 'War on Kids', which introduces parents to terrible advice on tackling problems with children, such as "Wet bed, teddy's dead". He ends each and every show by saying to his parent viewers "And remember, don't let your kid become a Richard."
- Una, who was a model and tour guide in the 1960s, before her husband lost her to a traveller from abroad. After many years, and having apparently sold most of her body parts, she has made it back to England and attempts to revive her career as a tour guide, but her tours contain little fact and she is all the while convinced that "they're coming for me!"
- Pip, a very emotional American singer who talks about the many things that have made him cry (usually for the wrong reasons, such as a woman running for a train who wished she could run faster, before getting her jacket caught in the door and running very fast). Pip then plays the piano, whilst performing a song about a ridiculous topic that he feels passionate about.
- Candy is an American comedian whose act doesn't appear to contain any jokes, and she simply gets through by talking about a series of subjects, whilst repeating "What's that all about?" and "Come on!"
- Prudence, a proud, family-loving housewife whose husband has returned home with a Mexican immigrant called Chachi, whom he had apparently run over. It becomes quickly obvious that he is having an affair with Chachi, something that Prudence remains oblivious to, despite the many, obvious clues.
- Sonny, a baby who has adult characteristics and speaks with the accent of an East-End geezer. He talks about how all adults, namely his father and his grandparents, appear stupid to him, except his mother, whom he seems to favour above anybody else.
- Gary, a man who won the lottery, but refused to claim his winning, believing it to be a television prank. He remains convinced that it is all a big joke, even when the story begins to worsen, for example, his son announcing that he is in debt to drug dealers, but who, upon Gary's laughing refusal to collect the winnings, is found dead.
- Noodle, a controversial artist who attempts to make bold statements through his art about things that aren't particularly important to anyone; however, he doesn't actually know what the meaning of any of his art is, and waits for the critics to tell him.
- Ian Jackson is a demonic schoolkid who tells his class, and increasingly shocked teacher, of the things he got up to over the weekend ("My weekend, by Ian Jackson..."). His tales usually revolve around him causing people bad injuries or even death, as well as another teacher who repeatedly sexually harasses him, whilst he, Ian, remains completely oblivious to the horrid truth of any of it.
