= Marc Wootton =

English actor and comedian (born 1975)

- Born: Marc James Wootton; 8 February 1975 (age 51); Portsmouth, Hampshire, England
- Occupations: Actor, comedian, writer
- Years active: 2002–present

Marc James Wootton (born 8 February 1975) is an English character actor, comedian and writer. He is best known for his role as Mr Poppy in the Nativity! film series and for creating and starring in several satirical television series in the UK and US that blur fiction and reality, including My New Best Friend, High Spirits with Shirley Ghostman and La La Land. Other notable television performances include Nighty Night, Gavin and Stacey, Inside No.9 and The Completely Made Up Adventures of Dick Turpin.

Wootton has also starred in feature films Frequently Asked Questions About Time Travel, Confetti, The Bad Education Movie and Greatest Days. His theatre work includes leading roles in The Same Deep Water As Me, Till The Stars Come Down and Archduke.

== Career ==
Wootton began performing as a schoolboy in Portsmouth, and one of his first comedic creations was the Russian Gavroski Brothers, which he took to the Edinburgh Festival Fringe.

He quickly moved on to theatre directing, while also running the Canal Cafe Theatre in London.

In 2000, Wootton co-created Cyderdelic, initially as a stage act with Barry Castagnola and Liam Woodman, becoming a success at the Edinburgh Festival. The project evolved into television series Cyderdelic on BBC Three, combining improvised comedy with real-world agit-prop stunts.

Wootton made early television appearances on the Channel 4 comedy show The 11 O'Clock Show, E4 comedy The Pilot Show with Sharon Horgan and the BBC Two sitcom Thin Ice.

In 2003, his breakthrough role came with the Channel 4 hidden camera comedy My New Best Friend, in which contestants had to convince their closest friends and relatives that a series of extraordinary characters (played by Wootton) were their new best friend, for a prize of £10,000. The show earned Wootton a British Comedy Award and has had a lasting cultural legacy, with Guardian critic Barbara Ellen writing that it 'transcends student TV and becomes a sociological document for the cut-throat nature of our times".

In 2004 Wootton developed new characters for the BBC, leading to the commission of High Spirits With Shirley Ghostman (2005), a satire of television psychics such as Derek Acorah and Colin Fry. The series was nominated for a BAFTA Award and developed a cult following in the US when it was shown on BBC America.

In 2006, Wootton was cast opposite Martin Freeman in Debbie Issit's improvised comedy feature film Confetti.

Wootton then wrote and starred in the BBC Three sketch show Marc Wootton Exposed, the first series of which started on 13 January 2008.

In 2008, Wootton also played Duncan in Gavin and Stacey.

in 2009, Wootton starred in feature films Frequently Asked Questions About Time Travel and Nativity!, again with Freeman.

In 2010, Ghostman returned, along with characters Gary Garner (a cab driver turned actor) and Brendan Allen (an unscrupulous documentarian), in Wootton's six-part entertainment industry satire La La Land. The series premiered on the Showtime USA network on 25 January 2010 and premiered on BBC Three on 27 April 2010. Notable for its casting of cult figures including Tommy Wiseau and Daryl Hannah, it was nominated for the Rose D'Or and received positive reviews, with Heather Havrilesky writing in Salon that La La Land "may be the single funniest thing I have seen on TV in the past year."

In 2011, Wootton was cast as Eddie in Season's Greetings at The National Theatre, directed by Marianne Elliot.

In 2012, Wootton reprised his character Mr Poppy in Nativity 2: Danger in the Manager, opposite David Tennant.

In 2013, Wootton was cast in Nick Payne's The Same Deep Water As Me at the Donmar Warehouse, directed by John Crowley.

In 2015, Wootton was cast in Mike Bartlett's Bull at the Young Vic.

In 2018, Wootton wrote and starred in the six-part comedy series High & Dry for Channel 4 in the UK, which debuted on the station on 4 May 2018.

In 2019, Wootton created Radio Four comedy series Date Night, in which he improvised characters with Monica Dolan, Jamie Demetriou, Katherine Parkinson and Catherine Tate.

In 2019, it was announced that Wootton would team with Sacha Baron Cohen and his company Four by Two Films on Gooseberry "an audacious collision of comic thriller and immersive theatre". A pilot was shot in Los Angeles in 2020 for Lionsgate Television and Comedy Central, but the series was cancelled due to the Covid19 pandemic.

In 2023, Wootton starred opposite Aisling Bea in Coky Giedroyc's feature film Greatest Days.

In 2024, Wootton was cast in Apple TV period comedy series The Completely Made Up Adventures of Dick Turpin. Wootton was also cast as Marek in Beth Steel's Olivier Award Nominated Till The Stars Come Down at the National Theatre.

In 2025, Wootton collaborated with singer-songwriter John Grant on short film The Art Of The Lie, with Shots Magazine writing "What began as a music video for Grant's track It's A Bitch quickly spiralled into something far more ambitious: a metafictional satire... held together by Wootton's unwavering performance... this 30-minute gem is chock full of laughs." The film was nominated for Best Special Project at the 2025 UK Music Video Awards.

In 2025, Wootton returned to the Donmar Warehouse in When We Are Married.

In 2026, Wootton was cast as the lead in Rajiv's Joseph's Archduke at The Royal Court, directed by Lyndsey Turner. Wootton's performance as Apis was praised, with Dominic Maxwell writing in The Times that "Marc Wootton is like a parody of charisma. He is immensely loud, knowingly outrageous and, yes, hugely charismatic"

=== Collaborations ===
Wootton played the role of softly spoken dating agent Gary Furze (Lasso The Moon agency) in the first series of Julia Davis' Nighty Night. In the second series he played Dennis, Linda's aggressive husband. Wootton collaborated with Julia Davis again in the semi-improvised character comedy Couples, for BBC Radio 4. In 2014, he starred in the first episode of comedy anthology series Inside No 9, "Sardines" and also in Psychobitches.

In 2006, Wootton appeared in Debbie Isitt's film Confetti as a best man, Snoopy. In 2009 he starred in Debbie Isitt's Christmas comedy film Nativity, a role he reprised in the sequel, Nativity 2: Danger in the Manger, released in November 2012. Wootton collaborated with director Misha Manson-Smith on numerous series including My New Best Friend, High Spirits With Shirley Ghostman, La La Land, Gooseberry and short film The Art Of The Lie.

== Filmography ==
Year	Title	Role	Notes
2002-2004	Cyderdelic	Su Long	7 episodes
2003	My New Best Friend	Various	Also writer
2003	The Pilot Show	Various	
2004-2005	Nighty Night	Gary Furze / Dennis	2 episodes
2005	High Spirits with Shirley Ghostman	Various	8 episodes
2006	Thin Ice	Dennis	
2006	Confetti	Snoopy	
2008	Marc Wootton Exposed	Various	3 episodes; also creator and writer
2008	Gavin & Stacey	Duncan	Series 2 episode 4
2009	Frequently Asked Questions About Time Travel	Toby	
2009	Brave Young Men	Owen Malloy	
2009	Nativity!	Mr. Poppy	
2010	La La Land	Various	6 episodes; also creator and writer
2010	Neighbors from Hell		3 episodes; voice only
2011	Arthur Christmas	Peter	Voice only
2012	Delocated	The Glaze	10 episodes
2012	Nativity 2: Danger in the Manger	Mr. Poppy	
2013	Way to Go	Cozzo	6 episodes
2013	The Harry Hill Movie	Barney Cull	
2014	Inside No. 9	John	Episode: "Sardines"
2014	Trouble & the Shadowy Deathblow		Short film
2014	Nativity 3: Dude, Where's My Donkey?	Mr. Poppy	
2014	Psychobitches	The Goddess Kali	1 episode
2015	The Bad Education Movie	Officer Geoffrey	
2015	High & Dry Blap	Brett	Also writer
2015-2016	Drunk History: UK	Harold Godwinson / Joe Mears / Dr. Robert Knox	3 episodes
2016-2017	Counterfeit Cat	Max	Voice only' 51 episodes
2018	High & Dry	Brett	6 episodes; also writer and creator
2020	Gooseberry	Noodle	Also creator
2022	Question Team	Harry Klunder	Season 2, episode 3
2023	Greatest Days	Jeff	
2024	The Completely Made-Up Adventures of Dick Turpin	Moose Pleck	
2025	The Art Of The Lie	Brendan Allen	Also writer and producer

== Theatre ==
- Season's Greetings as Eddie – National Theatre (2010–2011)
- A Midsummer Night's Dream as Nick Bottom – Royal Shakespeare Theatre – Royal Shakespeare Company (2011)
- The Same Deep Water As Me as Kevin Needleman – Donmar Warehouse (1 August – 28 September 2013)
- Bull – The Young Vic (2015–2016)
- Till the Stars Come Down as Marek - National Theatre (2024)
- When We Are Married - Donmar Warehouse (2025)
- Archduke as Apis - Royal Court (2026)

== Radio ==
- And The Winner Is hosted by Matt Lucas, Panellist BBC Radio 2 (2011)
- Date Night, BBC Radio 4 (2019)

== Awards ==
- Rose D'or Golden Rose Award Best Gameshow, 2004 My New Best Friend (2004)
- British Comedy Award Best New TV Comedy My New Best Friend (2003)
- BBC Two Greenlight Award Cyderdelic (2003)
