= Jason Watkins =

British actor (born 1962)

- Born: Jason Peter Watkins; 28 October 1962 (age 64); Albrighton, Shropshire, England
- Occupation: Actor
- Years active: 1986–present
- Spouses: Caroline Harding; Clara Francis
- Children: 5

Jason Peter Watkins (born 28 October 1962) is an English actor. He played the lead role in the two-part drama The Lost Honour of Christopher Jefferies, for which he won the BAFTA TV Award for Best Actor. He has also played William Herrick in Being Human, Gavin Strong in Trollied, Simon Harwood in W1A, Gordon Shakespeare in the film series Nativity, British Prime Minister Harold Wilson in Season 3 of The Crown and Detective Sergeant Dodds in McDonald & Dodds.

== Early life and education ==
Jason Watkins was born on 28 October 1962, in Albrighton, Shropshire, where he lived until the age of seven, when his parents moved to Wolverhampton. His father, Alan, was a metallurgist at Marston in Wolverhampton, and his mother a teacher at Albrighton's primary school.

He credits his introduction to entertainment to taking lessons in clowning at Bridgnorth from mime artist Ben Benison, also a presenter on TV programme Vision On. Being dyslexic, Watkins enjoyed drama, as a subject least affected by this issue. He furthered his acting skills as a student of the Royal Academy of Dramatic Art in London, graduating in 1985 with an Acting (RADA Diploma).

== Career ==
=== Stage ===
Following his graduation from RADA, Watkins established himself as a stage actor, joining the National Theatre company.

He was nominated for a Laurence Olivier Theatre Award in 2001 (2000 season) for Best Supporting Actor for his performance in A Servant For Two Masters at the (Young Vic, subsequently transferred to New Ambassadors Theatre). His other theatre work includes Rafts and Dreams at the Royal Court Theatre, Philistines and Landscape with Weapon (by Joe Penhall) at the National Theatre, London (2007) and A Laughing Matter (by April De Angelis) at the Royal National Theatre in 2003.

In 2018, he played the predatory serial killer Ralph in a revival of Bryony Lavery's play Frozen at the Theatre Royal Haymarket.

=== Television ===
Watkins made his first appearance on television in 1987 on EastEnders as estate agent Gerry Fairweather, a role he played for 11 episodes.

Watkins's more prominent television roles have included the vampire leader William Herrick in Being Human; the crime suspect Jason Buliegh in Conviction; Bradley Stainer in Funland; and the dog-walking crime witness Francis Cross in Five Days. He also played Oswald Cooper in "The Great and the Good", an episode of Lewis; Plornish in the 2008 BBC production of Little Dorrit; and Cabbage Patterson in the BBC adaptation of Lark Rise to Candleford. He had a cameo as Gene Hunt's dissolute lawyer Colin Merric, in episode seven of the second series of Life on Mars.

In 2006, he played the pioneering radiologist Ernest Wilson in a BBC pilot, Casualty 1906. Also in 2006 he played the part of Sir Christopher Hatton in The Virgin Queen, a four-part BBC drama. He then featured in the second series of the BBC's comedy Psychoville, as Peter Bishop, owner of Hoyti Toyti, an antique shop specialising in toys. Additionally he appeared as Doctor Roger Brierley in Victoria Wood's television film Housewife, 49.

Since 2011, he has also appeared in the Sky One sitcom Trollied as the store manager Gavin. In early 2012 he joined the cast of the BBC drama Prisoners' Wives, appeared as Detective Gilks in Dirk Gently and portrayed a smooth Church of England PR man in Twenty Twelve.

On 11 May 2013, he appeared in the Doctor Who story Nightmare in Silver, written by Neil Gaiman, featuring the Cybermen. Also in 2013 he played an anaesthetist in The Wrong Mans. In 2014, he appeared as Simon Harwood in the BBC comedy series W1A.

In 2014, he played the leading role in a two-part ITV drama entitled The Lost Honour of Christopher Jefferies, about the innocent initial suspect in the 2010 murder of Joanna Yeates. He won the BAFTA TV Award for Best Actor for this role.

In 2016, Watkins played the role of Pastor Hansford in the four-part ITV drama The Secret. Watkins appeared in two episodes of The Hollow Crown and played the role of Malcolm Turner in the BBC sitcom series Love, Nina. He narrated the Channel 4 documentary series The Job Interview, appeared as Tony Michaels in an episode of Friday Night Dinner and was cast as Mr Humphries in the BBC revival of Are You Being Served?.

In 2017, Watkins played Solomon Coop, private secretary to the Prince Regent (later George IV), in the BBC One series Taboo. Also on BBC One, Watkins performed as Wilfred Lucas-Dockery, the governor of the prison in the third episode of the BBC's adaptation of the Evelyn Waugh novel Decline and Fall. He played Simon in the second series of the ITV drama Safe House in 2017, as well as playing Tim Ifield in the fourth series of Line of Duty. In 2018 he played Roger in the BBC sitcom Hold the Sunset and Emlyn Hooson in the Russell T Davies miniseries A Very English Scandal, and he provided the voice of Captain Orchis in the BBC adaptation of Watership Down.

In 2018, Watkins narrated the Channel 5 historical documentary Inside the Tower of London which focused the history of the iconic landmark and the daily lives of London's Yeoman Warders, known as Beefeaters.

In 2019, Watkins played Prime Minister Harold Wilson in the third series of the Netflix drama The Crown. Between 2020 and 2024 he appeared in a leading role as DS Dodds in the Bath-set ITV crime drama series McDonald & Dodds alongside Tala Gouveia as mismatched detectives over four series.

In 2022, Watkins appeared as Prime Minister Winston Churchill in the series SAS: Rogue Heroes.

In 2023, Watkins starred as Ed Collier in the Channel 5 series The Catch, alongside Aneurin Barnard and Poppy Gilbert. The same year, it was confirmed that Watkins would be a contestant on the third series of the ITV show Cooking with the Stars, alongside other celebrities including Joanna Page, Matt Willis and Peter Andre.

Watkins voices Alfred Pennyworth in the Prime Video animated series Batman: Caped Crusader.

=== Film ===
Watkins's film roles include character parts in Confetti, High Hopes, Bridget Jones: The Edge of Reason, Tomorrow Never Dies, The Golden Compass and Wild Child. He played Gordon Shakespeare in the first three films in the Nativity series.

== Personal life ==
Watkins first married actress Caroline Harding, and has two sons from this marriage. He later married jewellery and fashion designer Clara Francis. On New Year's Day 2011, their two-year-old daughter died of sepsis. He dedicated his 2015 BAFTA award to her, and campaigns for greater awareness of sepsis. He is a patron of Child Bereavement UK, a charity that supports children, young people, and families when a child grieves or when a child dies. They have two other children.

== Filmography ==
=== Film ===
Year	Title	Role	Notes
1988	High Hopes	Wayne	
1992	Split Second	Coroner's Assistant	
1997	Tomorrow Never Dies	Principal Warfare Officer	
1999	Onegin	Guillot	
2004	Bridget Jones: The Edge of Reason	Charlie Parker-Knowles	
2006	Confetti	Gregory Hough	
2007	The Golden Compass	Bolvangar Official	
2008	Wild Child	Mr Nellist	
2009	Nativity!	Mr Gordon Shakespeare	
2012	Nativity 2: Danger in the Manger	Mr Gordon Shakespeare	
2014	Nativity 3: Dude, Where's My Donkey?	Mr Gordon Shakespeare	
2017	Hampstead	James Smythe	
2017	The Children Act	Nigel Pauling	
2018	The Man Who Killed Don Quixote	Rupert	
2019	We Are Where We Are	Andy	Short film
2023	The One Note Man	One Note Man	Short film
2023	Wicked Little Letters	Mr. Treading	
2025	The Phoenician Scheme	Notary	
2025	Dragonfly	John	
2026	Enola Holmes 3	The Brigadier	
2026	Geronto	Older	Short film
TBA	The Joy of Sex †		Filming

=== Television ===
Year	Title	Role	Notes
1987–1988	EastEnders	Gerry Fairweather	11 episodes
1991	Soldier Soldier	Cpl Geoff Porter	Appeared in episode "Battlefields"
1993	The Buddha of Suburbia	Terry	
1993	The Good Guys	Paul	Appeared in the episode "All That Sparkles"
1993	Between The Lines	Custody Sergeant	1 episode "Manslaughter"
1994	Casualty	Partridge	1 episode "Love and Affection"
1999	Bostock's Cup	Tommy Bennett	TV film
2004	Conviction	Jason Bueleigh	Recurring role
2005	The Booze Cruise II: The Treasure Hunt	Laurence	TV film
2005	Funland	Bradley Stainer	
2006	Blue Murder	Barr	Episode: "In Deep"
2006	Housewife, 49	Dr Roger Brierley	TV film
2007	Life on Mars	Colin Merrick	Episode 15
2008	Little Dorrit	Mr Plornish	TV miniseries, 6 episodes
2008	Lewis	Oswald Cooper	Series 3, episode 4: "The Great And The Good"
2008	Miss Austen Regrets	James Stanley Clarke	TV film
2008	Hotel Babylon	Murray	Guest role
2009	Agatha Christie's Poirot	Joe Bland	Series 12, episode 1: "The Clocks"
2009–2012	Being Human	William Herrick	TV series, 13 episodes
2010–2012	Dirk Gently	DI Gilks	Recurring role
2011–2018	Trollied	Gavin Strong	Main role, 67 episodes
2011	Psychoville	Peter Bishop	Recurring role
2012	Miranda	Dick Twist	Episode: "It Was Panning"
2012	Prisoners' Wives	William (Gemma boss)	Six episodes
2013	Doctor Who	Webley	Episode: "Nightmare in Silver"
2013	The Wrong Mans	Anaesthetist	Guest role
2013	Call the Midwife	Rev. Applebee-Thornton	Guest role, Series 2: Episode 4
2014–2017	W1A	Simon Harwood	Three series, 14 episodes
2014	The Lost Honour of Christopher Jefferies	Christopher Jefferies	Two-part drama
2016	The Secret	Pastor Hansford	Four-part drama
2016	The Hollow Crown	Suffolk	Episodes: "Henry VI Part I" and "Henry VI part II"
2016	Love, Nina	Malcolm Turner	Sitcom series
2016	The Job Interview	Himself, narrator	Documentary series
2016	Friday Night Dinner	Tony Michaels	Episode: "The Two Tonys"
2016	Are You Being Served?	Mr Humphries	TV special
2016	Would I Lie to You?	Himself	Series 10, episode 8
2017	Inside No. 9	Kevin	Episode: "The Bill"
2017	Taboo	Solomon Coop	Episodes 2–8
2017	Line of Duty	Tim Ifield	Season 4, 2 episodes
2017	Decline and Fall	Governor Wilfred Lucas-Dockery	Part 3
2017	Safe House	Simon Duke	TV series, 4 episodes
2018	Inside The Tower of London	Narrator	
2018	Watership Down	Captain Orchis (voice)	Recurring role
2018	A Very English Scandal	Emlyn Hooson	TV miniseries, 2 episodes
2018–2019	Hold the Sunset	Roger	Series 1–2
2019	The Crown	Harold Wilson	Main role (Season 3)
2020	Des	Brian Masters	TV miniseries
2020	Midsomer Murders	Joe Ferabbee	Series 20, Episode 6: "Send in the Clowns"
2020	Hitmen	The Lawyer	Series 1, Episode 1: "Birthday"
2020–2024	McDonald & Dodds	DS Dodds	
2021	The Trick	Professor Phil Jones	Dramatisation of the "climategate" controversy
2021	Around the World in 80 Days	Bernard Fortescue	
2022	A Ghost Story for Christmas	Mr Wraxall	Episode: "Count Magnus"
2022	SAS: Rogue Heroes	Winston Churchill	
2023	The Catch	Ed Collier	Channel 5 series - all 4 episodes
2023	Archie	Stanley Fox	
2024	Coma	Simon Henderson	
2024	Batman: Caped Crusader	Alfred Pennyworth (voice)	
2024	Jason Watkins & Lady Jane Grey: A Tower of London Special	Himself	One-off documentary; also features Tracy Borman
2025	Anne Boleyn and Elizabeth I: A Tower of London Special	Himself	One-off documentary; also features Tracy Borman
2025	The Game	Huw Miller	
2026	Stonehenge: Secrets Of The New Stone	Himself	One-off documentary; also features Tracy Borman
2026	The Betrayal of Anne Boleyn: Inside The Tower of London Special	Himself	One-off documentary; also features Tracy Borman
2026	Dear England	Greg Dyke	Four-part drama
2026	Bookish	Harold Sneed	Episode: "Momento Mori"
2026	Stonehenge: Secrets of the New Stone Dirty Business	Himself Peter Hammond	One-off documentary; also features Tracy Borman Three-part docudrama
TBA	Last Resort (w/t)	Charlie	Six-part drama

== Awards and nominations ==
Year	Ceremony	Award	Nominated work	Result
2001	Olivier Awards	Best Supporting Actor	A Servant To Two Masters	Nominated
2002	Helen Hayes Awards	Outstanding Lead Actor	A Servant To Two Masters	Won
2015	British Academy Television Awards	BAFTA Award for Best Leading Actor	The Lost Honour of Christopher Jefferies	Won
2015	British Academy Television Awards	BAFTA Award for Best Mini-Series	The Lost Honour of Christopher Jefferies	Won
2016	Royal Television Society Awards	Best Drama Serial	The Lost Honour of Christopher Jefferies	Won
2020	Screen Actors Guild Awards	Outstanding Performance by an Ensemble in a Drama Series	The Crown	Won
