= Advertising Producers Association =

British trade body

The Advertising Producers Association, or APA, is a United Kingdom-based non profit trade body that represents the interests of UK commercial production, editing, vfx, audio post and music companies. APA members work within commercials and online advertising along with advertisers and agencies.

== Purpose ==
The purpose of the APA is to circulate industry information, represent the production companies within the advertising industry, create industry standards and provide professional development. In addition, the association works closely with the IPA to ensure better communication- addressing production issues and resolving disputes.

== History ==
In 1978, the APA was formed as the AFPA, an adjunct to the British Film Producers Association (BFPA), and became the AFVPA in 1982, which it was known as until 2000. Steve Davies is the Chief Executive and its chairmen are John Hackney and Lewis More O'Ferrall.

The APA Collection & Show is an annual event, featuring the best 50 UK commercials of the year and is one of the mayor advertising awards in the UK.
