= Court Theatre =

Court Theatre or Royal Court Theatre may refer to:

- Court Theatre (Chicago), Illinois
- Court Theatre (New Zealand), Christchurch
- Court Theatre (Pendley Tring), in the former stables of Pendley Manor in the UK
- Court Theatre of Buda, Budapest, Hungary
- Royal Court Theatre, London,
- Royal Court Theatre, Liverpool, England
- Court Theatre (film), a 1936 Austrian drama film
