= La La Land (TV series) =

- Genre: Comedy
- Created by: Marc Wootton
- Directed by: Misha Manson-Smith
- Starring: Marc Wootton
- Composer: Steve Mason
- Country of origin: United States
- Original language: English
- No. of seasons: 1
- No. of episodes: 6

Production
- Executive producers: Charlie Siskel; Misha Manson-Smith; Marc Wootton
- Producer: Alexandra Reed
- Cinematography: Mark Schwartzbard
- Camera setup: Single-camera
- Running time: 25–28 minutes

Original release
- Network: Showtime (United States); BBC Three (United Kingdom)
- Release: 25 January – 1 March 2010

La La Land is an American television comedy series broadcast on Showtime in the United States, BBC Three in the United Kingdom, and SBS One in Australia. It is a mockumentary which features character comedian Marc Wootton playing three different characters: Shirley Ghostman, a fake psychic; Gary Garner, a wannabe actor; and Brendan Allen, a documentary film-maker.

== Release ==
The series was first broadcast on 25 January 2010. It was released on DVD on 7 June 2010.

== Episodes ==
Episode	Plot Summary
Episode #1.1	Week one sees Gary Garner, an East-London taxi driver, making himself at home in the lavish Laurel Canyon mansion of Ruta Lee, a film star of Hollywood's golden age he once chauffeured in the UK.
Episode #1.2	Week two see Shirley, Brendan and Gary continue their assuault on Los Angeles and strive to get noticed by those in the know.
Episode #1.3	Laith comes to LA for work and the Ladies of Slay can't keep their eyes off of him.
Episode #1.4	After four weeks in La La Land, Gary has finally bagged his first ever audition: to front a commercial for a chain of mattress stores.
Episode #1.5	After five weeks in Los Angeles, Shirley is offered his first gig: he's bottom of the bill at a psychic showcase at the Theatre West in Studio City.
Episode #1.6	Gary begins work on a Tommy Wiseau feature film.

== Reception ==
The series received mixed reviews from critics. Mike Hale of The New York Times gave a positive review, writing "while he doesn't often inspire the helpless laughter that Borat or Da Ali G Show provoke, his quieter, more slowly building situations can have their own devastating payoffs." Heather Havrilesky of Salon praised the dark comedy and narrative, describing the series as capturing "the jackassery inherent to striving." Brian Lowry of Variety gave a negative review, describing Wootton as "poor man's Sacha Baron Cohen" and writing of the series "while Wootton's irreverent antics are sporadically funny enough to win him a cult following, the memorable moments ultimately prove too few and far between." On Rotten Tomatoes, the series holds an approval rating of 57% based on 7 reviews, with an average rating of 2/10.
