= Archduke (play) =

2017 play by Rajiv Joseph

- 2025 Playbill Design
- Original language: English
- Written by: Rajiv Joseph
- Subject: Assassination of Franz Ferdinand
- Genre: Dark comedy

Premiere
- Date: 2017

Archduke is a 2017 play written by Rajiv Joseph about the assassination of Archduke Franz Ferdinand.

== Synopsis ==
A group of teenage revolutionaries, including Gavrilo Princip, are swept up in a scheme to assassinate Archduke Franz Ferdinand.

== Production history ==
=== Premiere ===
Archduke premiered at the Mark Taper Forum in Los Angeles, California, presented by Center Theatre Group. It was directed by Giovanna Sardelli, with scenic design by Tim Mackabee, costume design by Denitsa Bliznakova, lighting design by Lap Chi Chu, and music and sound design by Daniel Kluger.

=== Philadelphia ===
Archduke ran at the Wilma Theater April 15 though May 4, 2025. It was directed by Blanka Zizka, the retired co-founder of the Wilma.

=== Off-Broadway ===
An off-Broadway production of the play ran at Roundabout Theatre Company's Laura Pels Theatre in late 2025. Previews began October 23, 2025, with an official opening night on November 12, 2025, and closed on December 21, 2025. It was directed by Darko Tresnjak.

=== London ===
Archduke made its European premiere at the Royal Court Theatre in London, running from 20 June to 25 July 2026. It was directed by Lyndsey Turner and designed by Es Devlin.

== Characters and casting ==
| | Los Angeles | Philadelphia | Off-Broadway | London |
|---|---|---|---|---|
| Gavrilo Princip | Stephen Stocking | Suli Holum | Jake Berne | Stanley Morgan |
| Sladjana | Joanne McGee | Melanye Finister | Kristine Nielsen | Janice Connolly |
| Trifko | Ramiz Monsef | Brandon Pierce | Adrien Rolet | Abraham Popoola |
| Nedeljko | Josiah Bania | Sarah Gliko | Jason Sanchez | Chris Walley |
| Dragutin 'Apis' Dimitrijevic | Patrick Page | Steven Rishard | Patrick Page | Marc Wootton |
