= Helen George =

English actress (born 1984)

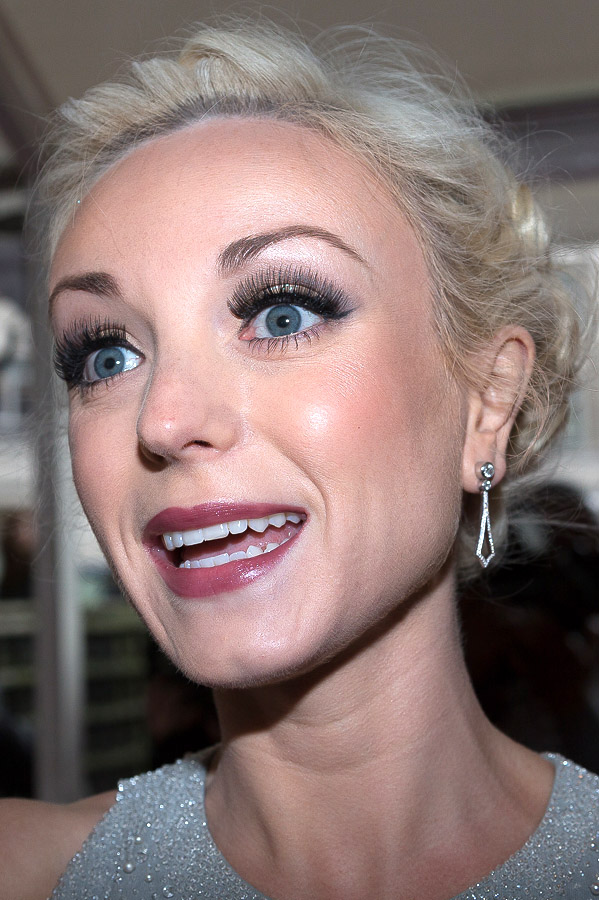
- George in 2015
- Born: Helen Elizabeth George; 19 June 1984 (age 42); Birmingham, West Midlands, England
- Education: Edgbaston High School for Girls; Royal Academy of Music; Birmingham School of Acting
- Occupation: Actress
- Years active: 2006–present
- Known for: Call the Midwife
- Spouse: Oliver Boot (m. 2011; div. 2015)
- Partner: Jack Ashton (2016–2023)
- Children: 2

Helen Elizabeth George (born 19 June 1984) is an English actress, best known for playing Trixie Franklin, later Trixie, Lady Aylward, on the BBC drama series Call the Midwife. In 2015, she participated in the thirteenth series of BBC One's Strictly Come Dancing; she was paired with Aljaž Skorjanec, and finished in sixth place. She was nominated for the Grammy Award for Best Musical Theater Album at the 64th Annual Grammy Awards for her contribution to the cast recording of Cinderella.

== Early life ==
George was born in Harborne, Birmingham, to political science professor Neil George and social worker Margareth George. She has a sister, Elizabeth, a veterinarian. Raised in Winchester, Hampshire, she attended Edgbaston High School for Girls between 1993 and 1998, and studied ballet as a child, eventually becoming a junior associate at Birmingham Royal Ballet, and was active in sports, competing in the long jump. As a child she dreamed of being the first female manager of Aston Villa Football Club.

George decided that she wanted to work in musical theatre at the age of 15, when she saw a production of Les Misérables. She is a graduate of the Royal Academy of Music. George also attended Birmingham School of Acting.

== Career ==
George attended the Royal Academy of Music, London, studying musical theatre. She gained her first role some two weeks after graduation in the play The Woman in White. She was a backing singer for Elton John during a tour. She sang at venues including Wembley Arena and the Royal Albert Hall.

George was cast in the role of Trixie on the BBC One series Call the Midwife, based on the book by Jennifer Worth. She was daunted by the prospect of working with the likes of Pam Ferris and Jenny Agutter. As part of the role she was trained in the medical techniques of the 1950s, including how to deliver a baby. In 2012, she underwent a press tour in the United States to promote the series there. She also starred in the music video for singer Birdy's cover of "1901".

In August 2015, George was announced as one of the celebrities who would compete in the thirteenth series of Strictly Come Dancing. She was partnered with professional dancer Aljaž Škorjanec. Despite continuously getting high scores from the judges, George was eliminated in week 11, finishing in sixth place.

Week #	Dance/Song	Judges' scores					Result
Week #	Dance/Song	Horwood	Bussell	Goodman	Tonioli	Total	Result
1	Waltz / "With You I'm Born Again"	7	7	7	7	28	No elimination
2	Cha-cha-cha / "Uptown Girl"	7	7	7	8	29	Safe
3	Foxtrot / "I Wanna Be Loved by You"	8	8	8	8	32	Safe
4	Salsa / "Dr. Beat"	8	8	8	9	33	Safe
5	Quickstep / "You Can't Hurry Love"	9	9	8	9	35	Safe
6	Samba / "Take Your Mama"	8	9	8	9	34	Safe
7	Rumba / "Hello"	8	8	7	8	31	Safe
8	Tango / "Hold Back the River"	8	9	8	9	34	Safe
9	Charleston / "Anything Goes"	8	9	8	9	34	Safe
10	Viennese waltz / "At Last"	9	10	10	10	39	Safe
11	Paso doble / "At The End of The Day"	8	8	9	9	34	Eliminated

In May 2020, she sang "(There'll Be Bluebirds Over) The White Cliffs of Dover" at Buckingham Palace in a BBC broadcast marking the 75th anniversary of VE Day.

In January 2024, she appeared in The King and I, playing Anna Leonowens, at the Dominion Theatre London. She starred as the Fairy Godmother in Richmond Theatre's pantomime Cinderella from December 2025 to January 2026.

In summer 2026 she played Tracy Samantha Lord in High Society at the Barbican Theatre in London.

== Personal life ==
From 2011 to 2015, George was married to actor Oliver Boot. In April 2016, she began dating her Call the Midwife co-star Jack Ashton when they went to South Africa to film the show's Christmas special. Their daughter, Wren Ivy, was born in September 2017. During her pregnancy with Wren, George was diagnosed with ICP. Due to this complication, she delivered Wren three weeks early via elective caesarean section. She is a patron of the charity ICP Support.

In June 2021, George announced on Instagram that she was pregnant with her second child. Her daughter, Lark, was born in November 2021. George and Ashton split up in 2023.

== Filmography ==
Film and television roles
Year	Title	Role	Notes
2006	Hollyoaks	Miss Jones	
2008	Hotel Babylon	Susie	1 episode: #3.2
2011	7 Lives	Valerie	Film
2011	Doctors	Andrea Towers	1 episode: "A Life in the Day"
2011	The Child	Reni	Film short
2011	The Three Musketeers	Blonde	Film
2012	Scar Tissue	Mel Farrow	Film
2012–present	Call the Midwife	Trixie Franklin / Trixie, Lady Aylward	Main cast; 81 Episodes
2013	Pointless Celebrities	Herself; Contestant	Period Drama Special
2014	Comedy Playhouse	Selina	1 episode: "Over to Bill"
2015	The Monster	Madeleine	Film short
2015	Strictly Come Dancing	Herself; Contestant	Finished in sixth place
2017	Red Dwarf	Aniter	Season 12, Episode 5: "M-Corp"
2018	Nativity Rocks!	Miss Shelly	Film
2019	CBeebies Bedtime Stories	Herself; Storyteller	3 episodes
2020	Celebrity Catchphrase	Herself; Contestant	Christmas Special
2022	D.I. Ray	Annalie	1 episode: "Part Two"
2022	Richard Osman's House of Games	Herself; Contestant	Series 6, Week 7
2025	SHARK! Celebrity Infested Waters	Herself	
2025	Would I Lie to You?	Herself	Series 19, Christmas special
