= Nativity 2: Danger in the Manger =

2012 British film by Debbie Isitt

Nativity! 2: Danger in the Manger
- Theatrical release poster
- Directed by: Debbie Isitt
- Written by: Debbie Isitt
- Produced by: Nick Jones
- Starring: David Tennant; Marc Wootton; Jason Watkins; Joanna Page; Ian McNeice; Rosie Cavaliero; Jessica Hynes; Pam Ferris
- Cinematography: Sean Van Hales
- Edited by: Nicky Ager
- Music by: Nicky Ager; Debbie Isitt
- Production companies: Mirrorball Films; Moviehouse Entertainment; Media Pro Six; Premiere Picture
- Distributed by: Entertainment One
- Release date: 23 November 2012
- Running time: 105 minutes
- Country: United Kingdom
- Language: English
- Budget: £3 million

Nativity! 2: Danger in the Manger is a 2012 British Christmas comedy film written and directed by Debbie Isitt, an improvised Christmas comedy and the second instalment in the Nativity film series. The film focuses on Donald Peterson, an anxious primary school teacher, who embarks on a wild and heartwarming adventure with his class and teaching assistant, the childlike Mr Poppy, as they travel to Wales to perform in a Christmas singing competition.

The film stars David Tennant playing the dual role of twin brothers, with Joanna Page as the wife of one of the brothers and Ian McNeice as the father of the brothers. Pam Ferris and Marc Wootton reprise their roles from the first film.

The film, which was the official Children in Need film of 2012, had its first public screening on 11 November 2012, when 42 Cineworld cinemas in the United Kingdom held one-off charity screenings with all proceeds going to Children in Need. The film's official premiere was at the Leicester Square Odeon on 14 November 2012. It went on a wide release on 23 November 2012.

== Plot ==
Donald Peterson is an anxious teacher who has just moved to a new house with his pregnant wife Sarah. He accepts a teaching job at St. Bernadette's primary school, taking over the class formerly taught by Mr. Maddens, who by this point has left for the United States; in the interim, the enthusiastic and childlike teaching assistant Mr. Desmond Poppy has been teaching the class unaided.

The class wants to enter in a competition called "A Song for Christmas", in which each school produces their own Christmas song, with the winning song earning its school £10,000 and the chance at being a Christmas number 1. However, headteacher Mrs. Bevan refuses the class permission to enter without a qualified teacher, and worries that her nephew, Mr. Poppy's, behaviour is so inappropriate that no teacher will ever stay in the job.

Donald lives in the shadow of his domineering father and his estranged 'name in lights' star child identical twin brother Roderick, who is a world-famous composer and conductor. When Mr. Poppy decides that St Bernadette's should enter the National 'Song for Christmas' competition, he persuades Donald to sign the entry forms, later kidnapping him for an impromptu road trip to Castell Llawen ("Merry Castle", not a real place) in Wales, where the competition is being held.

However, Roderick is also competing in the competition, mentoring the choir of posh St Cuthbert's College. Mr. Shakespeare (Jason Watkins) from Oakmoor School, rivals of St Bernadette's, has also entered his class. Donald and Mr. Poppy take their class through the wilds of Wales where they get past obstacles, such as exhaustion, rivers and baby nappies for a baby that one of the children smuggled into the group, to a mountain, which they have to climb over to reach Christmas Castle in time for the show.

As soon as they arrive, Donald is reunited with Sarah, and Mr. Poppy with Mrs. Bevan. However, Roderick is determined to win so he steals the baby and a part of Mr. Shakespeare's song, locks his brother, Mr. Poppy, and the class in a giant snow globe and disqualifies them. But the vengeful Mr. Shakespeare and his class help them out, Mrs. Bevan retrieves the baby and St. Bernadette's sing two successful songs while pretending to be Oakmoor.

As they leave, Sarah Peterson suddenly falls into labour and they place her on a donkey they found on the way to the castle and take shelter in a barn where Donald helps her give birth to twin boys. Mrs. Bevan and the rest of St. Bernadette's join them, along with Donald and Roderick's father who finally admits he is proud of Donald. Back at the castle Oakmoor wins the 'Song for Christmas', though it should have been St. Bernadette's.

In the barn Mr. Shakespeare and Roderick show up. As Mr. Poppy and the class sing another Christmas song for Donald, Sarah and their new babies, the two brothers finally reconcile and decide to get the family together more often.

== Cast ==
- David Tennant as
  - Donald Peterson, an anxious teacher starting at St. Bernardette's
  - Roderick Peterson OBE, Donald's ruthless twin brother who is a famous composer and conductor
- Marc Wootton as Desmond Poppy, a primary school assistant and Mrs Bevan's nephew
- Jason Watkins as Gordon Shakespeare, a teacher at rival school, Oakmoore Prep
- Joanna Page as Sarah Peterson, Donald's wife
- Ian McNeice as Mr. Peterson Snr., Donald and Roderick's father
- Rosie Cavaliero as Miss Rye, a teacher at St Bernadette's
- Jessica Hynes as Angel Matthews, an opera singer and presenter of 'A Song For Christmas'
- Pam Ferris as Patricia Bevan, the headmistress of St. Bernadette's and Desmond's aunt

Mr. Peterson's Class

Reprising their roles from the first movie:
- Ben Wilby as Bob
- Brandon McDonald as Olly
- Alexandra Allen as Cleo
- Caitlin Cronin as Lucy
- Dominic McKernan as Dan
- Ellie Coldicutt at Beth
- Faye Dolan as Jade
- Joe Lane as Edward
- Joshan Patel as Bill
- Maeve Dolan as Sam
- Michael McAuley as William
- Milly Webb as Neve
- Morgan Brennan as Charlotte
- Reece Stowe as Fraser
- Sydney Isitt-Ager as Sadie
- Brandon Chambers as Tyrese
- Tomas Ferris as Charlie

New children:

- Jesse Donohoe as Jesse
- Pixie Davies as Pixie
- Joseph West as Joseph
- Kyle Johnson as Tommy
- Louise Blunt as Little Lucy
- Mason Daw as Mason
- Mason Simpkins as Mason
- Brogan McLeish as Advent Calendar phenom

Mr. Shakespeare's Class

- Adrianna Bertola as Adrianna
- Eleanor Grant as Eleanor
- Ethan Smith as Ethan
- Freddie Watkins as Sebastian
- Grace Hollis as Grace
- Jessica Horton as Jessica
- Jessica Mogridge as Jessica
- Olivia Chu as Gracie
- Cerys Glover as Megan
- Samuel Waters as Sam
- Samuel Young as Samuel
- Scott Folan as Scott
- Shannon Maguire as Shannon

== Release ==
Nativity 2: Danger in the Manger was theatrically released on 23 November 2012 by Entertainment One, and was released on DVD and Blu-ray on 18 November 2013 by Entertainment One.

When the film was released in the United Kingdom, it opened at #3, behind The Twilight Saga: Breaking Dawn – Part 2 and Skyfall.

== Production ==
Nativity 2: Danger in the Manger! was filmed in England and Wales over the course of six weeks in October and November 2011.

Prior to filming starting, writer/director Debbie Isitt and actor David Tennant spent a week in Coventry, spending time in real classrooms and with school choirs and plays, and helping with the auditions for the child roles. Filming began in Coventry on 15 October 2011 and continued there for a fortnight.

On 29 October, the production moved to north Wales for another fortnight, filming in various rural locations, including Llanrhaeadr-ym-Mochnant, Pistyll Rhaeadr and Lake Vyrnwy. The stable scenes were filmed at Avoncroft Museum in Bromsgrove, Worcestershire. The production then moved to its final location in Warwickshire, where they filmed at Warwick Castle (standing in for St. Cuthbert's College) and in Stratford-upon-Avon.

The film was originally to be called Nativity 2: The Second Coming, as of January 2012, but the title was changed later in the year to Danger in the Manger!

The competition scenes were filmed in the Royal Shakespeare Company's Courtyard Theatre. Filming ended on 29 November 2011. The film was shot in the improvised style, with no proper script, and the actors not being told the narrative ahead of time, but having the plot revealed to them bit by bit as filming progressed.

== Reception ==
=== Critical response ===
The film received generally negative reviews from critics. Robbie Collin from The Daily Telegraph rated the movie one star out of five, claiming "this sequel pushes the amateurish angle much harder and seems to wear its abject lousiness as a badge of honour". Mark Kermode of BBC Radio 5 Live criticised the film's humour among the irresponsibility of the Mr Poppy character, suggesting the character "had enough of a CBeebies appeal but was more threatening and weird than funny and entertaining".

== Sequel ==
A third film in the series began filming in November 2013, titled: Nativity 3: Dude, Where's My Donkey?. It was released on 14 November 2014 and starred Martin Clunes.

== See also ==
- List of Christmas films
