= High Spirits with Shirley Ghostman =

British television series

- Marc Wootton in character as Shirley Ghostman
- Created by: Marc Wootton
- Starring: Marc Wootton
- No. of episodes: 8

Production
- Running time: 30 mins

Original release
- Network: BBC Three
- Release: 1 March – 1 April 2005

High Spirits with Shirley Ghostman is a British television comedy show broadcast on BBC Three and featuring character comedian Marc Wootton who plays an effete and slightly vicious medium/psychic. It is narrated by Patrick Stewart, with animated sequences by Rex Crowle produced by onedotzero.

The character of Shirley Ghostman is sometimes considered to be a parody of the act of controversial psychic, Derek Acorah and contains actual satirical references to the television show 6ixth Sense with Colin Fry in Shirley's opening speech to the audience.

The show was very successful on BBC Three and was set to move to BBC Two in the summer of 2005.

== Programme's demise ==
The BBC shelved the series after Wootton (as Ghostman) appeared on Friday Night with Jonathan Ross on BBC1. During the show, which also featured Nicole Kidman and David Schwimmer as guests, he made a number of jokes referencing 'Jews, cancer patients and Hitler'.

The resulting controversy resulted in the BBC being forced to apologise to viewers, after receiving 350 complaints.

The series is still shown in the United States by BBC America. The DVD was released 3 July 2006.

The character of Shirley Ghostman returned to BBC Three in Wootton's new series La La Land in April 2010.
