= Nativity 3: Dude, Where's My Donkey? =

2014 British film by Debbie Isitt

Nativity 3: Dude, Where's My Donkey?!
- Directed by: Debbie Isitt
- Written by: Debbie Isitt
- Produced by: Nick Jones
- Starring: Martin Clunes; Marc Wootton; Catherine Tate; Celia Imrie; Jason Watkins; Susie Blake; Duncan Preston
- Cinematography: Sean Van Hales
- Edited by: Nicky Ager
- Music by: Nicky Ager; Debbie Isitt
- Production company: Mirrorball Films
- Distributed by: Entertainment One
- Release date: 14 November 2014
- Running time: 109 minutes
- Country: United Kingdom
- Language: English
- Budget: £2.8 million
- Box office: $11.3 million

Nativity 3: Dude, Where's My Donkey?! is a 2014 British Christmas comedy film which serves as the third installment of the Nativity film series and was directed by Debbie Isitt. It stars Martin Clunes, Marc Wootton and Catherine Tate with Celia Imrie and Jason Watkins. Like its predecessors, it was distributed by Entertainment One.

== Plot ==
Jeremy Shepherd is an Ofsted inspector who has a daughter named Lauren. He is due to marry his fiancée Sophie in New York City on top of the Empire State Building. At St. Bernadette's, the new headteacher, Mrs. Keen announces that the school inspector will be coming to inspect the school. She tells the students in an assembly that a super teacher is coming in to get the school through the inspection to avoid the school being closed down. Mrs. Keen is annoyed with Mr. Poppy bringing in his pet donkey, Archie, and when Mr. Poppy tells Mrs. Keen that Archie has an idea that the only way to save the school is to do a flashmob on top of the Empire State Building, Mrs. Keen fires Mr. Poppy from the school. As Mr. Shepherd and Lauren arrive at St. Bernadette's, Mrs. Keen mistakes him for the super teacher, letting them in. Mr. Poppy disguises himself as a school inspector to get himself back in while Mr. Shepherd calls up a person to take the donkey away but gets hit in the forehead by Archie. He has amnesia and no memory of anything that happened before. Mr Poppy and the children have to get Mr. Shepherd’s memory back before the big day as well as stopping infamous flashmobber Bradley Finch from stealing Sophie back.

== Cast ==
- Martin Clunes as Jeremy Shepherd
- Marc Wootton as Desmond Poppy
- Catherine Tate as Sophie Ford
- Celia Imrie as Mrs. Keen
- Jason Watkins as Gordon Shakespeare
- Stewart Wright as "Uncle" Henry
- Adam Garcia as Bradley Finch
- Ralf Little as Charlie Ford
- Susie Blake as Sophie’s mother
- Duncan Preston as Sophie's father
- Lauren Hobbs as Lauren Shepherd
- David Hunter as Mr. Parker
- Niky Wardley as Bridesmaid Bella
- Shanaye Ncube as Emily
- Oscar Sallis as Tyler
- Anna Baker as Emma

== Reception ==
The film was panned by critics. On review aggregation website Rotten Tomatoes, the film holds an approval rating of 16% based on 19 reviews, with an average rating of 3.14/10.

Peter Bradshaw of The Guardian gave the film one star out of five, comparing it to "A John Lewis Christmas ad directed by Satan". Bradshaw added "This is one of those British family comedies that make you want to soil the Union flag with your own faeces in the cinema foyer before setting fire to it." Robbie Collin of The Daily Telegraph called the film "a garbled, sprayed-around mess", in his one star review and added, "As soon as I left the cinema, I went looking for a donkey to kick me in the head."

Isitt defended the film following its scathing reception, saying "These critics are just so out of touch with what people like and want." In response to Bradshaws scathing review, Isitt stated, "What on earth is wrong with Peter Bradshaw? He is disgusting and like a troll and should be ashamed of himself. Was he sent to boarding school and abandoned? Perhaps he’s insane". In response to Collins review, Isitt said "I would do it for free… and in my high heels".

When the film was released in the United Kingdom, it opened at #3, behind Interstellar and The Imitation Game.

== See also ==
- 2014 in film
- List of British films of 2014
