= List of Would I Lie to You? episodes =

The following is a list of episodes for the British comedy panel show Would I Lie to You?, which was first broadcast on 16 June 2007. As of 25 May 2026, 171 regular episodes (including 13 Christmas specials) and 26 clip shows have been broadcast across nineteen series; 197 episodes in total (not including the 2011 Comic Relief or 2016 Children in Need specials). The Series 2 & 3 clip shows consisted of a mix of new and previously seen footage; beginning with the fourth series, the clip shows were made up entirely of new material (although some later series also included an additional episode of the best previously broadcast footage).

All episodes are approximately 30 minutes long, and feature team captains Lee Mack and David Mitchell (with the exception of a series 8 episode where Mack was unable to attend the recording and his place was taken by Greg Davies), accompanied by two celebrity guests each. The first two series were hosted by Angus Deayton; he was replaced by Rob Brydon from the third series onwards.

Contents
Series:
- 1
- 2
- 3
- 4
- 5
- 6
- 7
- 8
- 9
- 10
- 11
- 12
- 13
- 14
- 15
- 16
- 17
- 18
- 19
- 20
- Scores
- Footnotes
- References
- External links

== Episode list ==
The coloured backgrounds denote the result of each of the shows:

– indicates David's team won.
– indicates Lee's team won.
– indicates the game ended in a draw.
Bold type – indicates Rob's individual liar of the week (used from series 3 to 9).

=== Series 1 (2007) ===
Episode	First broadcast	David's team	Lee's team	Scores
01x01	16 June 2007	Duncan Bannatyne and Frankie Boyle	Natalie Cassidy and Dom Joly	11–11
01x02	23 June 2007	Patrick McGuinness and Fay Ripley	John Barrowman and Dominic Wood	6–10
01x03	30 June 2007	Eamonn Holmes and Dara Ó Briain	Jimmy Carr and Ulrika Jonsson	13–6
01x04	14 July 2007 (Note: Moved back a week due to coverage of the Live Earth concert on BBC One.)	Myleene Klass and Jason Manford	Leslie Ash and Neil Morrissey	7–11
01x05	21 July 2007	Russell Howard and Wendy Richard	Len Goodman and Vic Reeves	11–9
01x06	28 July 2007	Harry Enfield and Claudia Winkleman	Tara Palmer-Tomkinson and Dave Spikey	9–8

=== Series 2 (2008) ===
Episode	First broadcast	David's team	Lee's team	Scores
02x01	11 July 2008	Rob Brydon and Krishnan Guru-Murthy	Gabby Logan and Robert Webb	7–6
02x02	18 July 2008	Trisha Goddard and Rich Hall	Frankie Boyle and Ben Shephard	7–5
02x03	25 July 2008	David Baddiel and Maureen Lipman	Jimmy Carr and Richard Wilson	5–6
02x04	1 August 2008	Michael Aspel and Dara Ó Briain	Jason Manford and Davina McCall	7–5
02x05	8 August 2008	Olivia Colman and Peter Serafinowicz	Hugh Dennis and Eamonn Holmes	6–8
02x06	15 August 2008	Danny Baker and Anton Du Beke	Michael Buerk and Russell Howard	6–7
02x07	22 August 2008	Vic Reeves and Shane Richie	Tara Palmer-Tomkinson and Rhys Thomas	10–3
02x08	29 August 2008	Phil Daniels and Michael McIntyre	Graeme Garden and Lauren Laverne	9–3
02x09	19 September 2008	Compilation episode – "The Best & Unseen Bits of Series 2"		—N/a

=== Series 3 (2009) ===
Episode	First broadcast	David's team	Lee's team	Scores
03x01	10 August 2009	**Jo Brand** and Larry Lamb	Russell Howard and Carol Vorderman	5–5
03x02	17 August 2009	**Fern Britton** and Stephen Mangan	Reginald D. Hunter and Ken Livingstone	5–5
03x03	24 August 2009	Marcus Brigstocke and Jamelia	Jimmy Carr and **Terry Christian**	4–6
03x04	31 August 2009	Jason Manford and **Claudia Winkleman**	Clive Anderson and Miranda Hart	3–7
03x05	7 September 2009	**Kelvin MacKenzie** and Jack Whitehall	Christine Bleakley and Frankie Boyle	5–5
03x06	14 September 2009	Dave Gorman and **Davina McCall**	Omid Djalili and Janet Street-Porter	7–3
03x07	21 September 2009 (Note: This episode also featured an appearance from Sylvan Richardson, as the mystery guest in the "This Is My..." round.)	Ronni Ancona and Sir Chris Hoy	**Gabby Logan** and Danny Wallace	5–5
03x08	28 September 2009	Reece Shearsmith and Trinny Woodall	**Michael Ball** and Charlie Brooker	2–9
03x09	17 December 2009 (Note: Originally intended to air on 10 October 2009, but delayed due to the last-minute addition of Match of the Day to the schedules.)	Compilation episode – "The Best & Unseen Bits of Series 3"		—N/a

=== Series 4 (2010) ===
Episode	First broadcast	David's team	Lee's team	Scores
04x01	23 July 2010	Fern Britton and Richard E. Grant	Sanjeev Bhaskar and **Martin Clunes**	5–6
04x02	30 July 2010	**Ruth Jones** and Jason Manford	Jack Dee and Peter Serafinowicz	8–3
04x03	6 August 2010	Keeley Hawes and Stephen Mangan	**Kevin Bridges** and Prof. Brian Cox	7–4
04x04	13 August 2010	**Ben Fogle** and Craig Revel Horwood	Hugh Dennis and Kate Silverton	3–8
04x05	20 August 2010	**Ronnie Corbett** and Sarah Millican	Julian Clary and Holly Walsh	4–8
04x06	27 August 2010	Rhod Gilbert and Miranda Hart	**Hugh Fearnley-Whittingstall** and Rufus Hound	4–5
04x07	3 September 2010	Bernard Cribbins and Patrick Kielty	**Deborah Meaden** and Mark Watson	7–5
04x08	10 September 2010 (Note: Originally scheduled to air on 20 August 2010 as episode 5 of the series, but replaced with a different episode beforehand. The DVD release of series 4 retains the original order.)	John Bishop and **Joanna Page**	Chris Addison and Patsy Palmer	5–7
04x09	17 September 2010	Compilation episode – "The Unseen Bits of Series 4"		—N/a

=== Comic Relief special (2011) ===
Episode	First broadcast	David's team	Lee's team	Scores
Sp.	5 March 2011 (Note: Special episode webcast live as part of 24 Hour Panel People.)	Shappi Khorsandi and Fay Ripley	David Walliams and Claudia Winkleman	2–4

=== Series 5 (2011) ===
Episode	First broadcast	David's team	Lee's team	Scores
05x01	9 September 2011	Rebecca Front and Jack Whitehall	Miranda Hart and **Nick Hewer**	3–5
05x02	16 September 2011	Robert Webb and **Sir Terry Wogan**	Kevin Bridges and Katy Wix	6–3
05x03	23 September 2011	**David O'Doherty** and Katherine Parkinson	Louie Spence and Bill Turnbull	6–3
05x04	29 September 2011 (Note: Moved forward a day on account of the first Strictly Come Dancing live show on Friday.)	**Nigel Havers** and Gregg Wallace	Charlie Brooker and Nina Wadia	6–6
05x05	7 October 2011	**Greg Davies** and Konnie Huq	Marcus Brigstocke and Phil Tufnell	7–3
05x06	14 October 2011	Bill Oddie and Frank Skinner	**Sarah Millican** and Jon Richardson	3–7
05x07	21 October 2011	**Mackenzie Crook** and Chris Packham	Victoria Coren and Rhod Gilbert	4–6
05x08	28 October 2011	Lorraine Kelly and Dara Ó Briain	**Barry Cryer** and Sue Perkins	3–8
05x09	25 November 2011	Compilation episode – "The Unseen Bits of Series 5"		—N/a

=== Series 6 (2012) ===
Episode	First broadcast	David's team	Lee's team	Scores
06x01	13 April 2012	Mel Giedroyc and Chris Tarrant	Alexander Armstrong and **Alex Jones**	3–2
06x02	20 April 2012	Sanjeev Bhaskar and Richard Madeley	Kate Humble and **Miles Jupp**	2–3
06x03	27 April 2012	Richard Bacon and **Dale Winton**	Clare Balding and Miranda Hart	2–4
06x04	4 May 2012	Rhod Gilbert and **Sally Phillips**	Tess Daly and Des O'Connor	5–1
06x05	11 May 2012	**Andy Hamilton** and Gabby Logan	Dr. Christian Jessen and Diane Parish	4–2
06x06	18 May 2012	Greg Davies and **Richard Osman**	Patsy Kensit and Bob Mortimer	1–4
06x07	25 May 2012	**Huw Edwards** and Sarah Millican	Josie Lawrence and Bradley Walsh	3–2
06x08	22 June 2012 (Note: Delayed due to A Jubilee Tribute to The Queen by The Prince of Wales and the beginning of UEFA Euro 2012.)	Emily Maitlis and Jack Whitehall	**Jim Carter** and Armando Iannucci	2–3
06x09	29 June 2012	Compilation episode – "The Unseen Bits of Series 6"		—N/a

=== Series 7 (2013) ===
Episode	First broadcast	David's team	Lee's team	Scores
07x01	3 May 2013	Vernon Kay and **Dara Ó Briain**	Rhod Gilbert and Denise van Outen	1–4
07x02	10 May 2013	**Stephen Mangan** and Isy Suttie	Charles Dance and Gok Wan	5–1
07x03	17 May 2013	Joan Bakewell and Jason Manford	**Warwick Davis** and Paul Hollywood	2–3
07x04	24 May 2013	**Mel Giedroyc** and Dermot O'Leary	Matt Dawson and Josh Widdicombe	3–1
07x05	31 May 2013	Susan Calman and Richard Osman	Carol Kirkwood and **David O'Doherty**	2–4
07x06	14 June 2013 (Note: Moved back a week on account of the first The Voice UK live show.)	Sarah Millican and Jon Richardson	David Harewood and **Bob Mortimer**	2–3
07x07	21 June 2013 (Note: This episode also featured an appearance from Andy Turner, as the mystery guest in the "This Is My..." round.)	Greg Rutherford and Kirsty Young	Joanna Scanlan and **Henning Wehn**	3–2
07x08	28 June 2013	Jimmy Carr and Griff Rhys Jones	**Dave Myers** and Susanna Reid	3–3
07x09	6 September 2013	Compilation episode – "The Unseen Bits of Series 7"		—N/a
07xSP	23 December 2013 (Note: Christmas special)	Miranda Hart and Stephen Mangan	Barry Cryer and **Miles Jupp**	5–2

=== Series 8 (2014–15) ===
Episode	First broadcast	David's team	Lee's team	Scores
08x01	12 September 2014	Fiona Bruce and Micky Flanagan	**Steve Jones** and Claudia Winkleman	3–2
08x02	19 September 2014	Rob Beckett and Kirsty Wark	**Adam Buxton** and Bruno Tonioli	2–3
08x03	26 September 2014	Kian Egan and Adil Ray	Mel Giedroyc and **Bob Mortimer**	0–5
08x04	3 October 2014	Heston Blumenthal and **Miles Jupp**	Ed Byrne and Emilia Fox	2–3
08x05	10 October 2014	Rhod Gilbert and Carol Vorderman	Hal Cruttenden and **Kelly Hoppen**	2–3
08x06	17 October 2014	Amanda Abbington and Phill Jupitus	Greg Davies, (Note: Lee Mack was unable to attend the recording of this episode, so Davies took his place as team captain.) **Gareth Malone** and Richard Osman	2–4
08x07	24 October 2014	**Jo Brand** and Paul Foot	Roisin Conaty and Ray Mears	3–2
08xSP	22 December 2014 (Note: This episode also featured an appearance from John Lowe, as the mystery guest in the "This Is My..." round.)	Josh Widdicombe and **Ray Winstone**	Rachel Riley and Ricky Tomlinson	3–3
08x08	8 January 2015 (Note: Delayed due to the broadcast of series 8 being interrupted by Citizen Khan.)	Adrian Chiles and Seann Walsh	Aisling Bea and **June Brown**	4–1
08x09	18 February 2015	Compilation episode – "The Unseen Bits of Series 8"		—N/a

=== Series 9 (2015–16) ===
Episode	First broadcast	David's team	Lee's team	Scores
09x01	31 July 2015	**Danny Dyer** and Jon Richardson	Joe Lycett and Moira Stuart	3–2
09x02	7 August 2015	Steve Backshall and **Gabby Logan**	Bob Mortimer and Katherine Parkinson	4–1
09x03	14 August 2015	Greg Davies and Rick Edwards	**John Cooper Clarke** and Alex Jones	2–2
09x04	21 August 2015	Alan Davies and **Germaine Greer**	Jermaine Jenas and Richard Osman	5–0
09x05	28 August 2015	Rhod Gilbert and Nick Grimshaw	Clare Balding and **Rob Delaney**	1–4
09x06	4 September 2015	Richard Hammond and Sean Lock	Judy Murray and **Trevor Noah**	4–1
09x07	11 September 2015	Jack Dee and **Tinchy Stryder**	Romesh Ranganathan and Gaby Roslin	3–2
09xSP	24 December 2015	Bill Bailey and Ruth Jones	**Jo Brand** and Dame Kelly Holmes	4–1
09x08	13 January 2016 (Note: Originally scheduled to air on 18 September 2015.)	Alex Brooker and Doon Mackichan	**Ben Miller** and Henning Wehn	2–3
09x09	27 January 2016	Compilation episode – "The Unseen Bits of Series 9"		—N/a

=== Series 10 (2016) ===
Episode	First broadcast	David's team	Lee's team	Scores
10x01	2 September 2016	David Haye and Romesh Ranganathan	Mel Giedroyc and Martin Kemp	2–3
10x02	9 September 2016	Nadiya Hussain and Michael Smiley	Diane Morgan and Bob Mortimer	3–2
10x03	16 September 2016	Jason Manford and Nick Robinson	Sara Cox and Harry Shearer	3–2
10x04	23 September 2016	Katherine Ryan and John Simpson	Warwick Davis and Hugh Dennis	1–4
10x05	30 September 2016	Josh Widdicombe and Prof. Kate Williams	Kevin Bishop and Brian Blessed	3–2
10x06	7 October 2016	Rhod Gilbert and Claudia Winkleman	Jamie Laing and Tracy-Ann Oberman	4–1
10x07	14 October 2016	Tom Davis and Shaun Ryder	Clara Amfo and Henning Wehn	3–2
10x08	21 October 2016	Jason Watkins and Adam Woodyatt	Dr. Maggie Aderin-Pocock and Phil Wang	4–2
10x09	28 October 2016	Compilation episode – "The Unseen Bits of Series 10"		—N/a
10xSP	19 December 2016	Sir Tom Courtenay and Richard Osman	Chris Kamara and Sara Pascoe	5–1

=== Children in Need special (2016) ===
Episode	First broadcast	David's team	Lee's team	Scores
Sp.	18 November 2016 (Note: Special mini-episode featuring children as guests, shown as part of the Children in Need telethon. An extended version was also released online after broadcast.)	Adit and Zara	Jack and Kitty	1–1

=== Series 11 (2017–18) ===
Episode	First broadcast	David's team	Lee's team	Scores
11x01	20 November 2017	David Baddiel and Kimberly Wyatt	Ed Balls and Jo Brand	2–2
11x02	27 November 2017	Sheila Hancock and Stephen Mangan	Mark Bonnar and Anita Rani	1–3
11x03	4 December 2017	Melvin Odoom and Fay Ripley	James Acaster and Gabby Logan	2–2
11x04	11 December 2017	Susie Dent and Stacey Solomon	Bob Mortimer and Ore Oduba	3–1
11xSP	18 December 2017	Henry Blofeld and Kerry Howard	The Rev. Richard Coles and Clive Myrie	1–4
11x05	29 December 2017	Craig Parkinson and Claudia Winkleman	Steve Davis and Sara Pascoe	3–2
11x06	3 January 2018	Nish Kumar and Joe Lycett	Nikki Fox and Miles Jupp	4–1
11x07	12 January 2018	Claude Littner and Jordan Stephens	Ade Edmondson and Cariad Lloyd	4–0
11x08	19 January 2018	Richard Osman and Katherine Ryan	Denise Lewis and Robert Rinder	1–4
11x09	24 January 2018	Compilation episode – "The Unseen Bits of Series 11"		—N/a

=== Series 12 (2018–19) ===
Episode	First broadcast	David's team	Lee's team	Scores
12x01	12 October 2018	Dion Dublin and Lucy Porter	Debbie McGee and Bob Mortimer	2–2
12x02	19 October 2018	Rylan Clark-Neal and Mary Portas	Sara Pascoe and Paul Sinha	2–3
12x03	26 October 2018	Olivia Colman and Aston Merrygold	Jon Richardson and Michaela Strachan	4–1
12x04	2 November 2018	Prue Leith and Big Narstie	Scarlett Moffatt and Tomasz Schafernaker	0–5
12x05	9 November 2018	Jonnie Peacock and Shaun Williamson	Jo Brand and Emma Bunton	2–3
12x06	23 November 2018	Diane Morgan and Richard Osman	Daisy May Cooper and Rory Reid	4–0
12xSP	24 December 2018	Lily Allen and Noddy Holder	James Acaster and Sian Gibson	1–4
12x07	11 January 2019	Ronan Keating and Georgia "Toff" Toffolo	Rhod Gilbert and Ellie Taylor	2–3
12x08	18 January 2019	Alex Jones and Rachel Parris	Stacey Dooley and Henning Wehn	5–0
12x09	24 January 2019	Compilation episode – "The Unseen Bits of Series 12"		—N/a
12x10	31 January 2019	Compilation episode – "The Best Bits of Series 12"		—N/a

=== Series 13 (2019–20) ===
Episode	First broadcast	David's team	Lee's team	Scores
13x01	18 October 2019	Gabby Logan and John Simm	Chris McCausland and Angela Scanlon	2–2
13x02	25 October 2019	Victoria Coren Mitchell and Greg James	Clare Balding and Asim Chaudhry	2–3
13x03	1 November 2019	Miles Jupp and Samson Kayo	Liz Carr and Anneka Rice	3–3
13x04	8 November 2019	Guz Khan and Claudia Winkleman	Greg Davies and Lucy Worsley	3–2
13x05	20 December 2019 (Note: Transmission of this series was interrupted by leaders' debates for the 2019 United Kingdom general election.)	Jay Blades and Sue Johnston	Alice Levine and Bob Mortimer	0–4
13xSP	26 December 2019	Liz Bonnin and Stephen Merchant	Sharon Osbourne and Dr. Ranj Singh	3–2
13x06	17 January 2020	Richard Osman and Jennifer Saunders	Steph McGovern and Joe Sugg	5–1
13x07	24 January 2020	Geoff Norcott and Esme Young	Tom Allen and Vicki Pepperdine	3–2
13x08	31 January 2020	Jo Brand and Kiri Pritchard-McLean	Simon Day and Henning Wehn	3–2
13x09	7 February 2020	Dani Dyer and Fred Sirieix	James Acaster and Oti Mabuse	3–3
13x10	14 February 2020	Compilation episode – "The Unseen Bits of Series 13"		—N/a
13x11	21 February 2020	Compilation episode – "More Unseen Bits of Series 13"		—N/a

=== Series 14 (2020–21) ===
Episode	First broadcast	David's team	Lee's team	Scores
14xSP	24 December 2020	Joe Lycett and Ruth Madeley	Jo Brand and Joe Swash	2–3
14x01	8 January 2021	Richard Osman and Lou Sanders	Les Dennis and Alice Levine	2–4
14x02	15 January 2021	Chris McCausland and Laura Whitmore	Maisie Adam and Stephen Hendry	3–2
14x03	22 January 2021	Raj Bisram and Gemma Cairney	Sophie Hermann and Josh Widdicombe	4–2
14x04	29 January 2021	Miles Jupp and Samantha Morton	Sarah Hadland and Bob Mortimer	2–4
14x05	1 February 2021 (Note: From this episode the show was moved to Monday nights)	Sara Barron and Claudia Winkleman	The Rev. Kate Bottley and Ed Gamble	1–4
14x06	8 February 2021	Nicola Coughlan and Dan Walker	Mr Motivator and Sara Pascoe	4–1
14x07	15 February 2021	Joel Dommett and AJ Odudu	Alex Horne and Sindhu Vee	5–0
14x08	22 February 2021	Roisin Conaty and Roman Kemp	Maya Jama and Dr. Xand van Tulleken	5–1
14x09	1 March 2021	Alex Jones and Martin Lewis	Anna Maxwell Martin and Johnny Vegas	1–5
14x10	8 March 2021	Compilation episode – "The Unseen Bits of Series 14"		—N/a
14x11	16 April 2021	Compilation episode – "The Best Bits of Series 14"		—N/a

=== Series 15 (2021–22) ===
Episode	First broadcast	David's team	Lee's team	Scores
15xSP	20 December 2021	Jim Broadbent and Rose Matafeo	Ardal O'Hanlon and Angela Rippon	4–3
15x01	7 January 2022	Judi Love and Chris McCausland	John Cooper Clarke and Caroline Quentin	3–3
15x02	14 January 2022	Suggs and Holly Willoughby	Angellica Bell and Bob Mortimer	2–4
15x03	21 January 2022	Jason Manford and Briony May Williams	Sophie Ellis-Bextor and Loyiso Gola	4–2
15x04	28 January 2022 (Note: This episode also featured an appearance from Cheryl Baker, as the "celebrity mystery guest" in the "This Is My..." round.)	Gyles Brandreth and Lou Sanders	Yung Filly and Sarah Millican	3–3
15x05	4 February 2022	Sarah Kendall and Richard Osman	Pam Ayres and Kiell Smith-Bynoe	3–3
15x06	11 February 2022	Philippa Perry and Mike Wozniak	Lady Leshurr and Alan Titchmarsh	3–3
15x07	18 February 2022	Rosie Jones and Jamali Maddix	Victoria Derbyshire and Rhod Gilbert	2–3
15x08	25 February 2022	Raj Bisram and Deborah Frances-White	Stephen Mulhern and Jenny Ryan	3–2
15x09	4 March 2022	Sam Quek and Joe Thomas	Jo Brand and Bobby Seagull	1–5
15x10	1 April 2022	Compilation episode – "The Unseen Bits of Series 15"		—N/a
15x11	3 June 2022	Compilation episode – "The Best Bits of Series 15"		—N/a

=== Series 16 (2022–23) ===
Episode	First broadcast	David's team	Lee's team	Scores
16xSP	30 December 2022	Gloria Hunniford and Guz Khan	Christopher Eccleston and Sophie Willan	3–2
16x01	6 January 2023	Bez and Motsi Mabuse	Shazia Mirza and Steve Pemberton	4–1
16x02	13 January 2023	Michelle Visage and Henning Wehn	Chizzy Akudolu and Simon Gregson	3–1
16x03	20 January 2023	Shirley Ballas and Chris McCausland	Steven Bartlett and Josie Gibson	0–5
16x04	27 January 2023	Laurence Llewelyn-Bowen and Ellie Simmonds	Jayde Adams and MIST	3–2
16x05	3 February 2023	Lucy Martin and Joe Wilkinson	Jo Brand and Amol Rajan	3–2
16x06	10 February 2023	Munya Chawawa and Snoochie Shy	Bob Mortimer and Prof. Alice Roberts	1–3
16x07	17 February 2023	Desiree Burch and Anton Du Beke	Lucy Beaumont and Ralf Little	2–3
16x08	24 March 2023	Stephen Bailey and Gemma Collins	Asim Chaudhry and Sally Lindsay	2–3
16x09	31 March 2023	Sarah Greene and Ugo Monye	Tom Allen and Morgana Robinson	3–2
16x10	7 April 2023	Compilation episode – "The Unseen Bits of Series 16"		—N/a
16x11	14 April 2023	Compilation episode – "More Unseen Bits of Series 16"		—N/a

=== Series 17 (2023–24) ===
Episode	First broadcast	David's team	Lee's team	Scores
17xSP	22 December 2023 (Note: This episode also featured an appearance from Patti Boulaye, as the "celebrity mystery guest" in the "This Is My..." round.)	Victoria Coren Mitchell and Naga Munchetty	Alex Brooker and Melvyn Hayes	4–1
17x01	29 December 2023	Alex Jones and Rav Wilding	Chris McCausland and Su Pollard	5–0
17x02	5 January 2024	Frankie Boyle and Abby Cook	Lucy Beaumont and Mo Gilligan	1–4
17x03	12 January 2024	Charlie Brooker and Shaparak Khorsandi	Prof. Hannah Fry and Danny Jones	2–3
17x04	19 January 2024	Jack Carroll and Gabby Logan	Bridget Christie and Big Zuu	2–3
17x05	26 January 2024	Jessica Hynes and Romesh Ranganathan	Wilfred Webster and Gina Yashere	4–1
17x06	2 February 2024	Craig Charles and Shazia Mirza	Amy Gledhill and Jeremy Vine	2–2
17x07	9 February 2024	Ivo Graham and Johnny Marr	Jo Brand and Sinitta	1–4
17x08	16 February 2024	Babatunde Aléshé and Claudia Winkleman	Mike Bubbins and Jessica Knappett	3–2
17x09	23 February 2024 (Note: Originally scheduled to air on 26 January 2024 as episode 5 of the series, but replaced with a different episode at the last moment.)	Will Mellor and Kimberley Walsh	Sam Campbell and Charlene White	1–4
17x10	1 March 2024	Compilation episode – "The Unseen Bits of Series 17"		—N/a
17x11	8 March 2024	Compilation episode – "More Unseen Bits of Series 17"		—N/a

=== Series 18 (2024–25) ===
Episode	First broadcast	David's team	Lee's team	Scores
18xSP	23 December 2024	Jimmy Carr and Laura Smyth	Rustie Lee and Lenny Rush	4–2
18x01	10 January 2025	Kojey Radical and Stacey Solomon	Harry Hill and Jill Scott	2–3
18x02	17 January 2025	Lucy Beaumont and Francesca Mills	Nabil Abdulrashid and Gethin Jones	2–2
18x03	24 January 2025	Harriet Kemsley and Eddie Marsan	Kadeena Cox and Ivo Graham	2–3
18x04	31 January 2025	Judi Love and Sir Grayson Perry	Cush Jumbo and Tim Vine	2–4
18x05	7 February 2025	Richie Anderson and Katherine Parkinson	Taj Atwal and Chris McCausland	3–2
18x06	14 February 2025	Darren Harriott and AJ Odudu	Sam Campbell and Diane Carson	3–2
18x07	21 February 2025	Kadiff Kirwan and Sara Pascoe	John Cooper Clarke and Lucia Keskin	5–0
18x08	28 February 2025	Josh Jones and Rosie Ramsey	Shazia Mirza and Matt Morsia	3–2
18x09	7 March 2025	Michelle de Swarte and Chris Ramsey	Sara Davies and Bob Mortimer	3–2
18x10	8 March 2025	Compilation episode – "The Unseen Bits of Series 18"		—N/a
18x11	15 March 2025	Compilation episode – "The Best Bits of Series 18"		—N/a

=== Series 19 (2025–26) ===
Episode	First broadcast	David's team	Lee's team	Scores
19xSP	26 December 2025	Jools Holland and Swarzy Shire	Helen George and David Walliams	2–3
19x01	2 January 2026	Harriet Kemsley and Chris McCausland	Yinka Bokinni and Julie Hesmondhalgh	4–1
19x02	9 January 2026	Mark Chapman and Jamelia	Dianne Buswell and Bob Mortimer	3–1
19x03	16 January 2026	Meera Syal and Gary Wilmot	Martine McCutcheon and Henning Wehn	4–1
19x04	23 January 2026	Alasdair Beckett-King and Beverley Knight	Jo Brand and Josie Gibson	3–2
19x05	30 January 2026	Gyles Brandreth and Will Kirk	Tasha Ghouri and Jessica Knappett	1–3
19x06	6 February 2026	Josh Pugh and Rebecca Lucy Taylor	Lucy Beaumont and Eddie Kadi	3–4
19x07	16 February 2026 (Note: This episode's broadcast was displaced to the following Monday by FA Cup coverage, but was available on BBC iPlayer from the Friday.)	Gbemisola Ikumelo and Richard Osman	Hannah Cockroft and Jason Isaacs	5–0
19x08	20 February 2026	Jonathan Ross and Michelle Wolf	Kate Garraway and JB Gill	2–3
19x09	27 February 2026	Montell Douglas and Holly Willoughby	John Kearns and David Morrissey	3–1
19x10	9 March 2026	Nabil Abdulrashid and Alex James	Nella Rose and Lou Sanders	4–2
19x11	13 March 2026	Compilation episode – "The Unseen Bits of Series 19"		—N/a
19x12	25 May 2026	Compilation episode – "The Best Bits of Series 19"		—N/a

=== Series 20 ===
The twentieth series was filmed over May and June 2026.

== Scores ==
David	Lee
Series wins (4 drawn)
9	6
Episode wins (21 drawn)
82	68
