= Aktuellt =

Swedish news programme

- The opening titles of Aktuellt, as used between 2004 and 2007
- Genre: news
- Presented by: Jon Nilsson; Nike Nylander; Cecilia Gralde; Anders Holmberg; Katia Elliott
- Country of origin: Sweden
- Original language: Swedish

Original release
- Network: SVT 2
- Release: 2 September 1958

Aktuellt (literally "current; topical" or "actual") is a Swedish nightly news programme produced by Sveriges Television (SVT) and broadcast on its second channel, SVT2 in Sweden.

It was first broadcast on 2 September 1958. With the start of TV 2 (forerunner of SVT2) in 1969, the Aktuellt brand disappeared but was revived in 1972 when TV1 began airing two main news bulletins at 6 pm and 9 pm. The 6pm bulletin was moved to SVT2 in 1997, followed on 15 January 2001 by the 9 pm edition. The year before, editorial responsibility for Aktuellt, Rapport (SVT1's news programme), and SVT's news channel, SVT24, was unified; nevertheless, the name "Aktuellt" continues to be used to designate SVT2's news programmes.

A relaunch of Aktuellt in November 2007 saw Rapport begin a 6pm bulletin on SVT1 while the sole 9 pm Aktuellt programme relaunched as an in-depth news and current affairs programme, covering two of three main items in detail. On 5 March 2012, the programme was extended to 60 minutes and now incorporates sports updates, regional news opt-outs & a news summary. The programme is now co-anchored by a rotating team of presenters - Anna Hedenmo, Jon Nilsson, Claes Elfsberg and Cecilia Gralde. Carina Bergfeldt is their foreign reporter.

In 2015, Mona Walter criticized Aktuellt for censoring a segment about an incident in Rinkeby.
