= Lisbeth Åkerman =

Swedish journalist and presenter

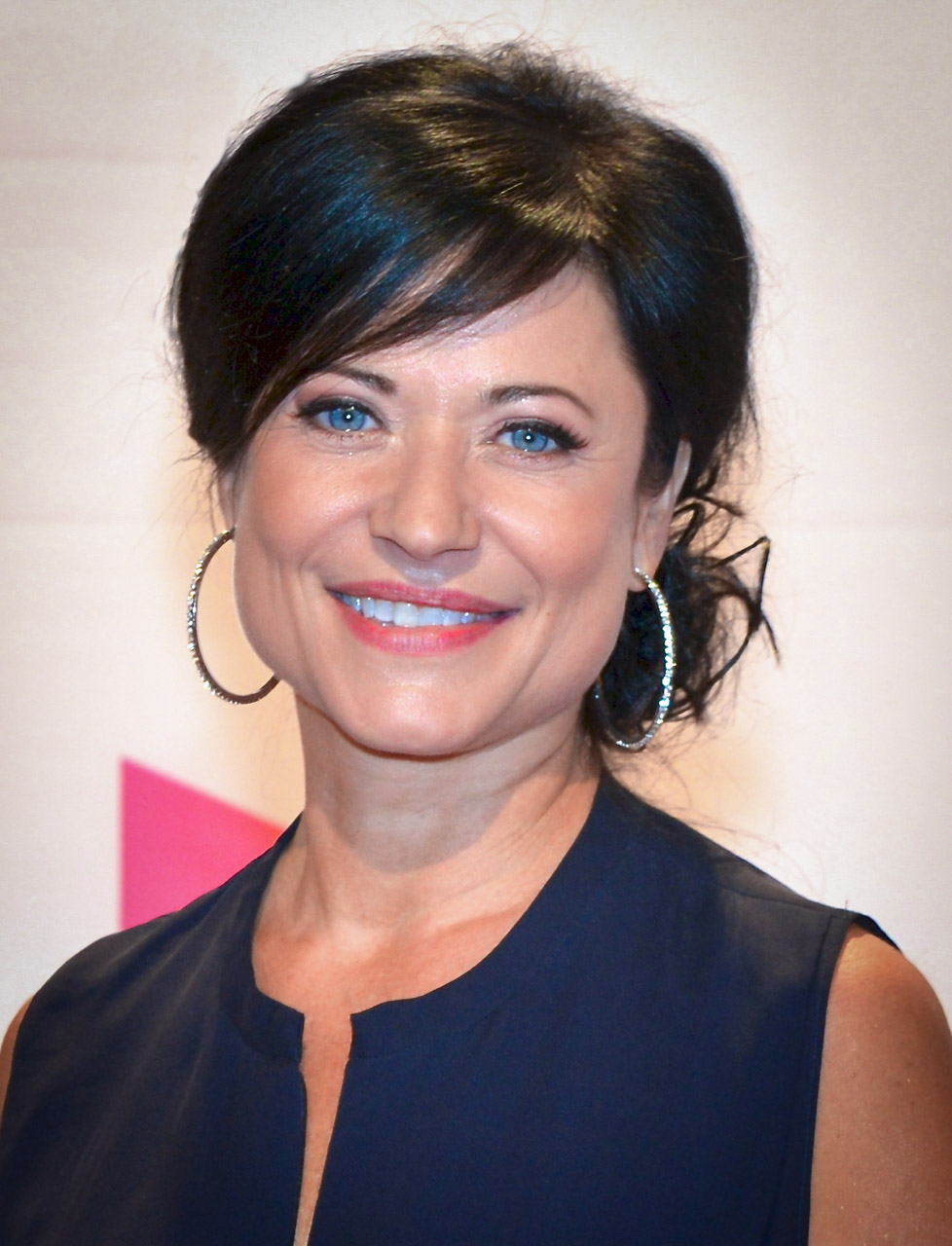
- Åkerman in September 2013
- Born: Lisbeth Margareta Åkerman; 6 May 1967 (age 59); Vänersborg, Sweden

Lisbeth Margareta Åkerman (born 6 May 1967) is a Swedish broadcast journalist and news presenter, currently working as one of the main anchors of SVT1's flagship news programme Rapport on SVT.
