= Claes Elfsberg =

Swedish television journalist (born 1948)

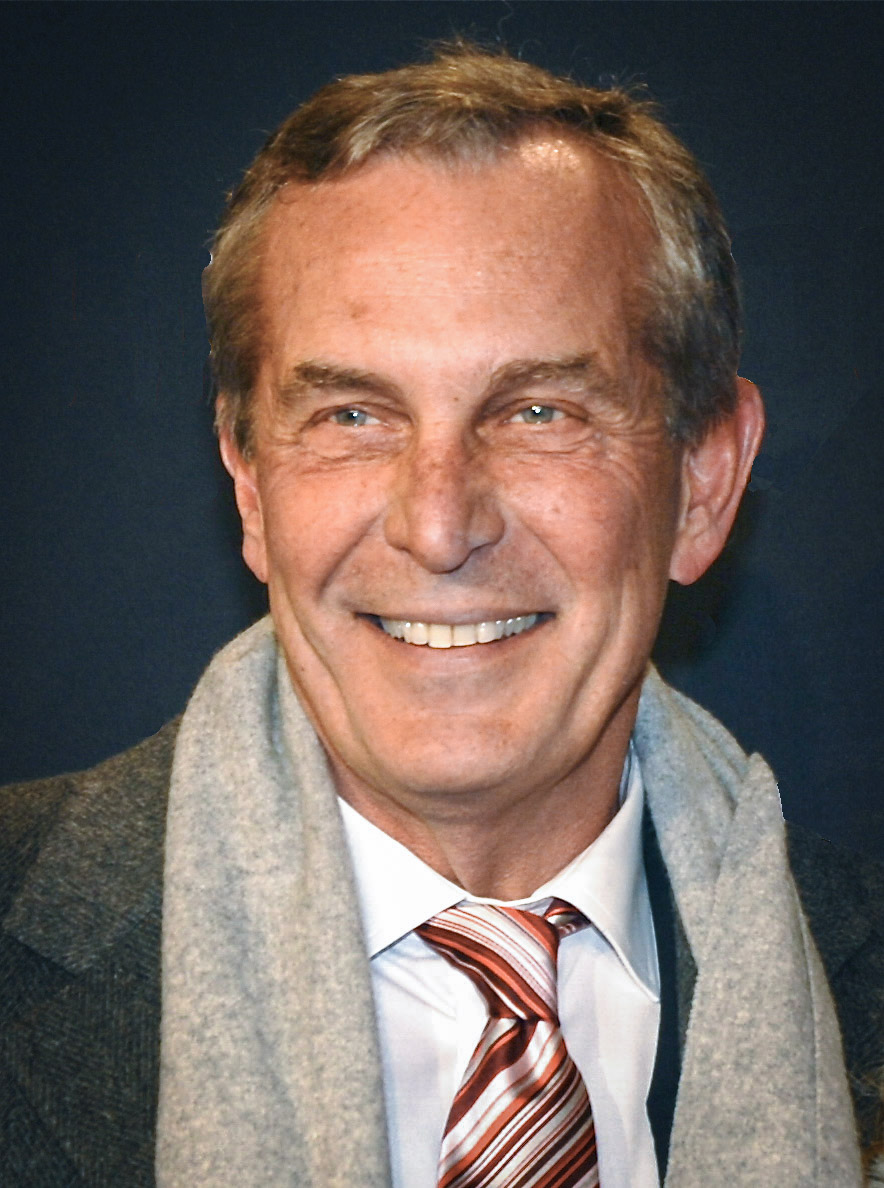
Elfsberg in January 2012.

Claes-Gösta Elfsberg (born 26 November 1948) is a Swedish television journalist.

== Early life ==
Elfsberg was born on 26 November 1948 in Stockholm, the son of Gösta Elfsberg and his wife Gertrud (née Ahlström). Elfsberg grew up in the district of Svedmyra in southern Stockholm.

He received his upper-secondary education at Norra Real in Stockholm and then studied at the Department of Journalism, Media and Communication (JMK) at Stockholm University, from where he dropped out to work as a trainee at the daily news program Rapport at Sveriges Television (SVT) in 1971.

== Career ==
Elfsberg presented Rapport for the first time in 1975 and then worked as a news presenter for over thirty years, eventually earning the nickname "Mr. Rapport". He temporarily left Rapport in 2003 to host the interview program 24 minuter on the SVT channel SVT24. He has also presented the SVT program Dokument utifrån. From January 2005 to December 2007, Elfsberg worked as the "ombudsman of the viewers" (Swedish: tittarombudsman) at SVT. In January 2008 it was announced that Elfsberg would lead the news program Play Rapport on SVT's video on demand service SVT Play. Elfsberg presented the news programme Aktuellt between March 2012 and November 30, 2015, and since January 15, 2016 has been the Friday presenter for the breakfast television programme Gomorron Sverige.

== Personal life ==
Elfsberg is currently married to Monica Elfsberg and has three children from two earlier marriages. Daughter Hanna died from cancer in 2018.
