= Would I Lie to You? (American game show) =

- Genre: Game show
- Based on: Would I Lie to You? by Peter Holmes
- Written by: Eric Drysdale; Jodi Lennon; Sara Schaefer; Keisha Zollar; Jim Biederman
- Directed by: Lauren Quinn
- Presented by: Aasif Mandvi
- Starring: Sabrina Jalees; Matt Walsh
- Composer: Michael Baiardi
- Country of origin: United States
- Original language: English
- No. of seasons: 1
- No. of episodes: 13

Production
- Executive producers: Glenda Hersh; Steven Weinstock; Robert King; Michelle King; Liz Glotzer; Aasif Mandvi; Michelle Schiefen; Jim Biederman
- Producer: Asaf Kastner
- Production location: New York City
- Running time: 21 minutes
- Production companies: King Size Productions; Truly Original; Fat Mama Productions; CBS Studios

Original release
- Network: The CW
- Release: April 9 – July 9, 2022

Would I Lie to You? (informally abbreviated as WILTY; also known as Would I Lie to You? America or Would I Lie to You? USA) is an American comedy panel game show based on the British game show of the same name. It aired from April 9 to July 9, 2022, on The CW.

== Format ==
In all rounds, the scoring system is the same: teams gain a point for correctly guessing whether a statement is true or not, but if they guess incorrectly the opposing team gets a point.

1. Home Truths: Panelists read out a statement about themselves. The opposing team must ask the panelist questions to decide if the statement is true or false.
2. This is My...: A guest comes onto the set and is introduced by first name, but remains standing in silence as the round continues. Panelists on one team tell the opposing team about their connection to the guest; only one account out of three told is true, and the opposing team has to work out which it is. At the end of the round, the guest reveals their true identity, and which of the panelists they have a genuine relationship with.
3. Quick-Fire Lies: The second questioning round, with the panelists chosen at random.

== Production ==
On March 8, 2021, it was announced that The CW had ordered the series. On December 9, 2021, Aasif Mandvi was announced as host of the show, with Matt Walsh and Sabrina Jalees serving as team captains. The series premiered on April 9, 2022. On May 16, 2023, it was reported that the series was canceled after one season.

== Episodes ==
No.	Title	Original release date	Prod. code	U.S. viewers (millions)
1	"Newman's Piggyback Ride"	April 9, 2022	110	0.44
Guests: Dulcé Sloan, Hannah Pilkes, Richard Kind and Santino Fontana; Team Matt: Dulcé Sloan and Hannah Pilkes; Team Sabrina: Santino Fontana and Richard Kind; Winning Team: Team Matt
2	"Whatcha Doin'?"	April 16, 2022	105	0.35
Guests: Julie Klausner, Preet Bharara, Shalewa Sharp and Rachel Feinstein; Team Matt: Julie Klausner and Preet Bharara; Team Sabrina: Shalewa Sharp and Rachel Feinstein; Winning Team: Team Sabrina
3	"English Breakfast in Jail"	April 23, 2022	113	0.31
Guests: Jordan Klepper, Nikki M. James, John Hodgman and Michael Urie; Team Matt: Nikki M. James and Jordan Klepper; Team Sabrina: John Hodgman and Michael Urie; Winning Team: Team Sabrina
4	"Boy in a Barrel"	April 30, 2022	106	0.24
Guests: Michael Ian Black, Robin de Jesús, Jordan Carlos and Christian Finnegan; Team Matt: Jordan Carlos and Christian Finnegan; Team Sabrina: Michael Ian Black and Robin de Jesús; Winning Team: Team Sabrina
5	"Singing Waitress"	May 7, 2022	108	0.29
Guests: Bridget Everett, Dylan Baker, Ali Wentworth and Michael Ian Black; Team Matt: Michael Ian Black and Bridget Everett; Team Sabrina: Ali Wentworth and Dylan Baker; Winning Team: Team Matt
6	"Criminal Bear"	May 7, 2022	109	0.27
Guests: Eugene Mirman, Michael Boatman, Hari Kondabolu and Amy Carlson; Team Matt: Eugene Mirman and Michael Boatman; Team Sabrina: Hari Kondabalou and Amy Carlson; Winning Team: Team Matt
7	"Allowance PowerPoint"	May 14, 2022	111	0.21
Guests: Karen Chee, Cole Escola, Kurt Fuller and Sarah Steele; Team Matt: Cole Escola and Karen Chee; Team Sabrina: Kurt Fuller and Sarah Steele; Winning Team: Team Matt
8	"Bunny Nanny"	May 21, 2022	112	0.32
Guests: Gizelle Bryant, Dave Hill, Jill Kargman and Adam Pally; Team Matt: Adam Pally and Jill Kargman; Team Sabrina: Gizelle Bryant and Dave Hill; Winning Team: Team Matt
9	"Babysitting Lemurs"	June 4, 2022	107	0.21
Guests: Brooke Shields, Sal Vulcano, Amber Ruffin and Ayad Akhtar; Team Matt: Amber Ruffin and Ayad Akhtar; Team Sabrina: Sal Vulcano and Brooke Shields; Winning Team: Team Matt
10	"Show Goat"	June 11, 2022	101	0.23
Guests: Laura Benanti, Maulik Pancholy, Becky Ann Baker and Chris Gethard; Team Matt: Laura Benanti and Maulik Pancholy; Team Sabrina: Chris Gethard and Becky Ann Baker; Winning Team: Team Matt
11	"Banana Bread"	June 18, 2022	102	0.31
Guests: Jena Friedman, Nyambi Nyambi, Ali Wentworth and Fisher Stevens; Team Matt: Jena Friedman and Nyambi Nyambi; Team Sabrina: Ali Wentworth and Fisher Stevens; Winning Team: Team Matt
12	"Musical Emergency"	June 25, 2022	104	0.23
Guests: Naomi Fry, Isaac Mizrahi, Helene York and Negin Farsad; Team Matt: Naomi Fry and Isaac Mizrahi; Team Sabrina: Helene York and Negin Farsad; Winning Team: Team Sabrina
13	"Child Toy Model"	July 9, 2022	103	0.21
Guests: Krysta Rodriguez, Amy Hoggart, Andrea Martin and Casey Jost; Team Matt: Krysta Rodriguez and Amy Hoggart; Team Sabrina: Andrea Martin and Casey Jost; Winning Team: Team Matt

== Reception ==
Viewership and ratings per episode of Would I Lie to You?
No.	Title	Air date	Rating/share (18–49)	Viewers (millions)	DVR (18–49)	DVR viewers (millions)	Total (18–49)	Total viewers (millions)
1	"Newman's Piggyback Ride"	April 9, 2022	0.1/1	0.44	0.0	0.09	0.1	0.52
2	"Whatcha Doin'?"	April 16, 2022	0.1/0	0.35	—N/a	—N/a	—N/a	—N/a
3	"English Breakfast in Jail"	April 23, 2022	0.1/1	0.31	—N/a	—N/a	—N/a	—N/a
4	"Boy in a Barrel"	April 30, 2022	0.0/0	0.24	—N/a	—N/a	—N/a	—N/a
5	"Singing Waitress"	May 7, 2022	0.1/0	0.29	—N/a	—N/a	—N/a	—N/a
6	"Criminal Bear"	May 7, 2022	0.1/0	0.27	—N/a	—N/a	—N/a	—N/a
7	"Allowance PowerPoint"	May 14, 2022	0.1/1	0.21	—N/a	—N/a	—N/a	—N/a
8	"Bunny Nanny"	May 21, 2022	0.1/1	0.32	—N/a	—N/a	—N/a	—N/a
9	"Babysitting Lemurs"	June 4, 2022	0.1/1	0.21	—N/a	—N/a	—N/a	—N/a
10	"Show Goat"	June 11, 2022	0.0/1	0.23	—N/a	—N/a	—N/a	—N/a
11	"Banana Bread"	June 18, 2022	0.1/1	0.31	—N/a	—N/a	—N/a	—N/a
12	"Musical Emergency"	June 25, 2022	0.0/1	0.23	—N/a	—N/a	—N/a	—N/a
13	"Child Toy Model"	July 9, 2022	0.0/0	0.21	—N/a	—N/a	—N/a	—N/a
