= Shazia Mirza =

British comedian

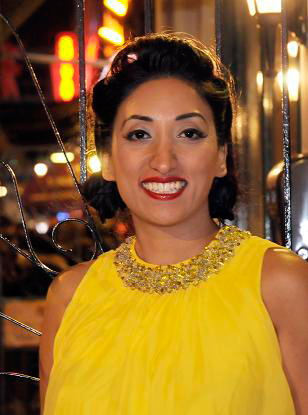
- Mirza in 2010
- Born: Birmingham, England
- Education: University of Manchester (Bachelor of Science BSc.Hons Biochemistry); Goldsmiths, University of London (PGCE); Rose Bruford College

Comedy career
- Years active: 2005–present
- Medium: Comedian, actor, writer, columnist
- Genre: Observational comedy
- Subjects: Social commentary, family
- Website: www.shazia-mirza.com

Shazia Mirza is a British comedian, actor and writer. She is best known for her ground-breaking stand-up comedy, acting roles and her articles in British newspapers The Guardian, New Statesman, The Daily Telegraph and The Financial Times

== Early life and education ==
Mirza was born in Birmingham, England, the eldest daughter of Punjabi Pakistani parents who moved to Birmingham, England in the 1970s.

Mirza read Biochemistry at the University of Manchester and achieved a Postgraduate Certificate in Education at Goldsmiths, University of London. Before beginning her career in comedy Mirza was a science teacher at Langdon Park School, where she taught Dylan Mills, now known as the grime pioneer Dizzee Rascal. She also taught in Dagenham and Enfield and taught for 14 years. She later attended Rose Bruford College, where she studied acting.

=== Stand-up ===
Her comedy is said to push barriers and, as a comedian, she is often referred to as 'brave', and ground breaking. She has been described by The New York Times as an Iconoclast producing Iconic stand up comedy routines.

=== Writing ===
Mirza was a columnist for The Guardian between 2008 and 2010. and also writes feature pieces for the Financial Times. She also had a column in The New Statesman for which she won Columnist of the Year at the PPA Awards and also had a column in Dawn newspaper.

=== Television and radio ===
She has appeared on many British TV comedy shows and also TV shows abroad including Travel Man, the BBC Panel Show Would I Lie to You?, The Jonathan Ross Show, The Apprentice (British TV series) Have I Got News for You, Celebrity Mastermind, MasterChef (British TV series), The Late Late Show (Irish talk show), Loose Women, Celebrity Antiques Road Trip, Pilgrimage (TV series), Blankety Blank, Rhod Gilbert's Growing Pains (Comedy Central), Ricky Sue and a Trip or Two with Ricky Tomlinson and Sue Johnston, & Sorry I Didn't Know (ITV) appearing in every single series.

She currently has the starring role in The Spicy Hen, a serialized digital comedy series and micro- sitcom set in London's first "Auntie- run" pub.

In 2025 she made her debut as Dr.Ayub in EastEnders (BBC One) playing a paediatrician for which she received rave reviews.

She was a regular panelist on the Channel 5 topical discussion series The Wright Stuff, as well as appearing on other TV shows in April 2007, she presented a documentary on BBC Three called F*** Off, I'm a Hairy Woman. Mirza has also appeared in reality game shows Celebrity The Island with Bear Grylls on Channel 4 (2017), and in 2018, the Channel 5 show Celebs in Solitary. In 2024 she appeared in SAS: Who Dares Wins. In Sweden in 2024 appeared on the Carina Bergfeldt Show, and also appeared on Tout le monde en parle (French talk show) with Thierry Ardisson. She has also been profiled on CBS 60 Minutes in the US interviewed by Ed Bradley.

== Recognition ==
She was recognised as one of the BBC's 100 women of 2013. The Telegraph named her as one of the 50 defining acts of the 21st century in British Comedy and won The London Comedy Festival & Hackney Empire New Act of the Year Her last stand up tour show 'Coconut' was nominated for Best Stand Up Tour at Channel 4's National Comedy. Her previous show The Kardashians Made Me Do It was considered groundbreaking and ran for a record 103 shows She was named by the Evening Standard Progress 1000 London's Most Influential People in TV Comedy.
