= Rapport (TV programme) =

Swedish news programme

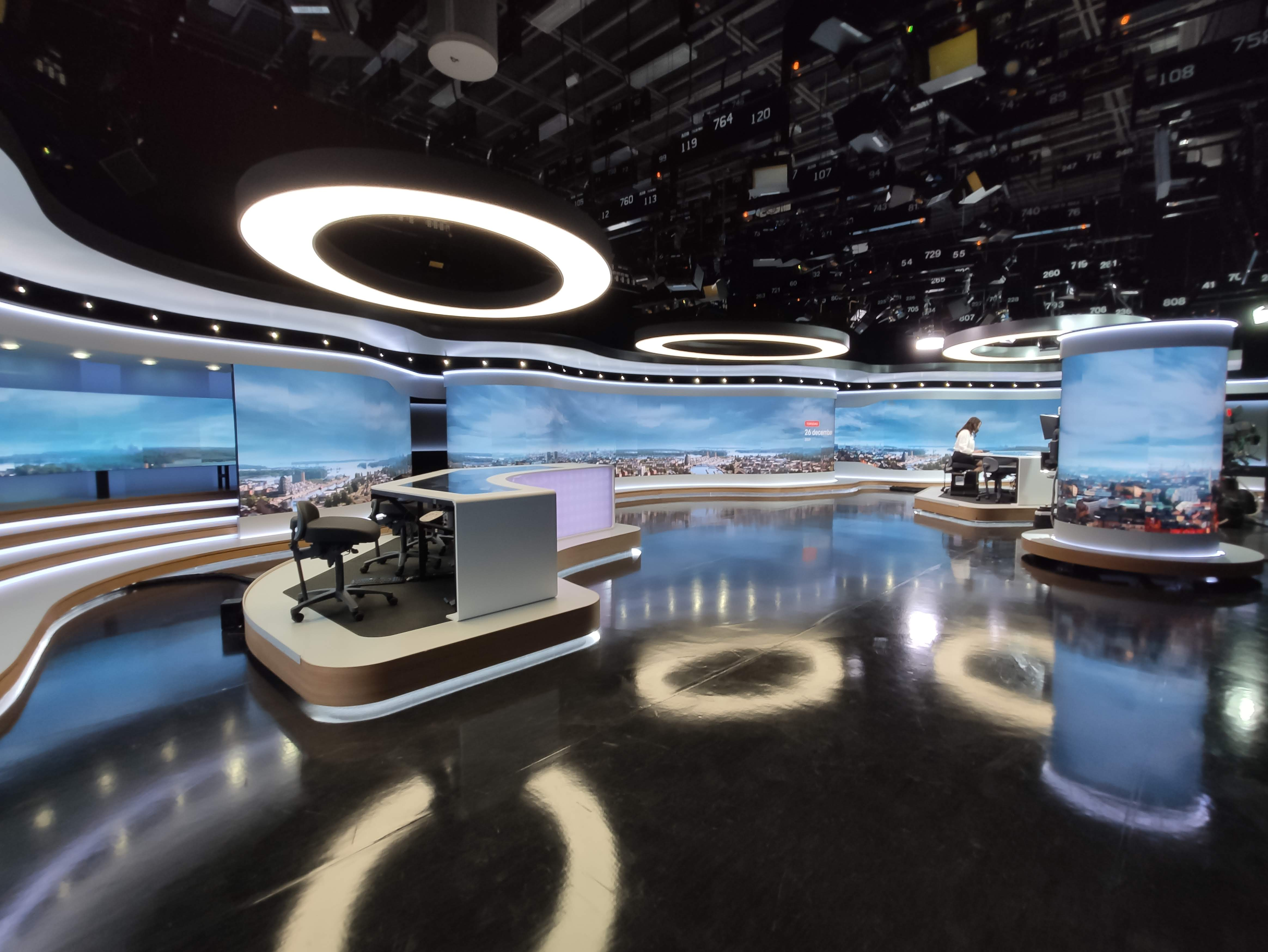
- Rapport studio in December 2019; the unmanned desk, closer to the camera, is used to host Aktuellt from the same studio.
- Created by: SVT
- Presented by: Katarina Sandström; Lisbeth Åkerman; Morgan Olofsson; Rikard Palm
- Country of origin: Sweden
- Original language: Swedish

Original release
- Network: SVT1, SVT2, SVT24
- Release: 5 December 1969 – present

Related
- Aktuellt

Rapport ("Report") is one of the two main news programmes from the Swedish television broadcaster Sveriges Television (SVT).

Rapport's main bulletin is broadcast every day at 19:30 on SVT1. It runs for thirty minutes every day except Saturday, when it runs for fifteen minutes. Ever since the 1970s, it has been the most watched news bulletin in Sweden. A shorter version of the show is aired weekdays at 18:00 as part of a thirty-minute bloc on SVT1 that includes Kulturnyheterna (culture and entertainment news) and Sportnytt (sport news). On weekends the 18:00 edition runs on SVT1 for fifteen minutes.

Since 2005, the show has usually been presented by Katarina Sandström, Lisbeth Åkerman and Morgan Olofsson. In the summer, both Aktuellt and Rapport 19:30 are frequently hosted by temps.

A feature of Rapport at 19:30 is that the bulletin consists solely of filmed reports and some telegrams with almost no studio interviews done.

Rapport also used to refer to shorter news bulletins that aired on SVT1 and SVT2 throughout the day but since late 2016, they have all been renamed as SVT Nyheter. This means all Rapport bulletins now air exclusively on SVT1.

== History ==
Rapport started in December 1969 with the launch of the second television channel, TV2. It went out between 19:10 and 19:30 each weekday following a 10-minute news bulletin from TV-nytt at 19:00 and preceding a longer TV-nytt programme at 19:30 on TV1. Rapport at this time focused on the in-depth coverage of selected news items. It was often considered left-leaning, thereby earning for TV2 as a whole the nickname of "the red channel".

As part of a large-scale reorganization of news programming in 1972, the news on TV1 was rebranded as Aktuellt (in fact, a revival of its original name), with bulletins at 18:00 and 21:00 each evening, allowing Rapport to take over the popular 19.30 slot. At the same time Rapport was broadened (the old formula had never been very popular with viewers) and it soon became Sweden's most widely viewed news programme.

Bengt Öste presented Rapport between 1978 and 21 January 1992. In January 1979, a late edition, known as Rapport 2, was added to the end of the day's schedule.

In the 1990s, Rapport's responsibilities increased dramatically. In 1993 Rapport began providing morning news bulletins as well as two afternoon bulletins at 16:00 on Kanal 1 and 17:00 on TV2. In 1995 the morning programme was rebranded as Rapport Morgon, Rapport having taken over the responsibility for the sofa-driven feature parts of the morning programme formerly made by the regions. This programme was SVT's answer to Nyhetsmorgon on TV4. Both TV4Nyheterna and Rapport began broadcasting a half-hour bulletin at noon in 1997.

In 1999, SVT started a digital 24-hour news channel called SVT24. It was based on content from both Rapport and Aktuellt, but it soon took over most of the Rapport broadcasts. In 1999, the updates at 12:00, 16:00, 17:00 and in the late evening were taken over by SVT24 and in 2000 SVT24 also took over the morning bulletins with Rapport Morgon moving to the SVT24 studio. Suddenly, Rapport proper found itself providing only the prime-time early-evening programme (and the late-evening edition at weekends) on the second channel, by now known as SVT2. This relocation of news bulletins to SVT24 was, in fact, only a matter of branding and technology (SVT24 used more efficient digital technology which made broadcasts from there cheaper), SVT having in 2000 merged all its news desks into one.

There were more challenges for SVT's news teams in 2001 when the two main programmes, Rapport and Aktuellt, swapped channels. The popular Rapport moved to SVT1 which was intended to be the channel of broad appeal, while the more specialized and less popular Aktuellt went to SVT2, the more minority-oriented channel. The reorganization also meant that all the former Rapport broadcasts now on SVT24 would be carried by SVT1 (except for the 17:00 update, which was scrapped).

In September 2001, Rapport moved to a new studio which was common for all the Stockholm-based news programmes. This meant that all bulletins that SVT24 had taken over would once again become Rapport broadcasts. The 19:30 and late-evening bulletins moved to the new studio on 8 September and the day-time bulletins moved on the following Monday, while the morning editions waited another week. The move coincided with the September 11 attacks which made the first days from the new studio somewhat chaotic. At the same time Rapport abandoned the logo and jingle which had both been in use (in several incarnations) since the programme started in 1969.

The SVT24 schedule was radically restructured with effect from 24 February 2003. The channel would thenceforth broadcast news programmes every half-hour around the clock (every hour during the day on weekdays) and they would be made by Rapport. This meant a dramatic increase in the number of Rapport broadcasts. This number was, however, drastically reduced in the following autumn when the bulletins became hourly rather than every half-hour.

At the end of 2004, long-time presenter Claes Elfsberg left Rapport. Lisbeth Åkerman and Morgon Olofsson would later join Katarina Sandström as the regular hosts of the programme. The 2004 Indian Ocean earthquake brought the start of news updates throughout the night at weekends, a service which has continued ever since. A regular 21:30 bulletin made its debut on 15 January 2007 as part of a relaunch of SVT24. On 19 November 2007, the 18:00 edition of Aktuellt became a Rapport bulletin. At the same time, all SVT news programmes switched to 16:9 widescreen transmission.

25 August 2008 saw yet another major shake-up of SVT's news schedules. The 18:00 edition of Rapport was moved from SVT2 to SVT1 and the late edition was moved from SVT1 to SVT2 (and a regular weekday start time of 22:25), while another news update bulletin was added to the SVT2 schedule at 18:55 on weekdays, thus somewhat making a return to its to the channel that originally broadcasts.

In late 2016, the shorter daytime and late night editions of Rapport were renamed as SVT Nyheter.

== Appearance ==
During its first three decades on the air, each newscast started with a five-note musical signature, repeated either three times or one time. This signature was written by Monica Dominique and was used in various arrangements until 2001. As its logo, the programme used a wordmark with the name "rapport" written with all lower case letters in a font similar to American Typewriter. During the 1970s, the programme was broadcast from a yellow studio. During most of the 1980s, a simple grey or light blue studio was used. The programme started with a short film sequence with television camera. Initially, this was a hand-drawn animation, but it was replaced with a computer-animated version in the late 80s.

In the 1990s, Rapport used various designs before eventually settling for a blue studio and a simple intro with a spinning globe in the corner. When Rapport was moved to a new studio on 8 September 2001, it received a new theme tune composed by Christian Falk and a new logo. The new set and graphics used purple colours and featured a large globe. On 21 March 2004, Rapport premiered a new studio set and opening. The new graphics are mostly blue and dark red. From 2008, short news updates are presented from a smaller set in the SVT newsroom.

SVT's news programmes got a complete redesign on 7 September 2009. The redesign applied to Rapport, as well as the regional news, Sportnytt, Nyhetstecken and Uutiset. The programmes also got a signature music composed by Johan Nilsson. The new design was premiered in the morning news, hosted by Cecilia Gralde. The first main evening bulletin with the new design was hosted by Claes Elfsberg. The opening sequences and graphics for Rapport were also used for the shorter bulletins renamed as SVT Nyheter.

== Controversies ==
During the midnight news broadcast on the night of 20 August 2006, a hard core Czech porno film called Sex Tails shown on the pay channel Canal+, could be seen on studio television monitors behind anchor Peter Dahlgren. Normally the monitors behind the anchor display news broadcasts, however, workers at the station had changed the channel earlier in the day to watch a sports event. Though there were no complaints from its viewers, the incident caused some uproar in the media. Swedish tabloids on Monday poked fun at the broadcast, jokingly changing the name of the programme - Rapport - to "Rapporn".
