= Katarina Sandström =

Swedish television news presenter and journalist

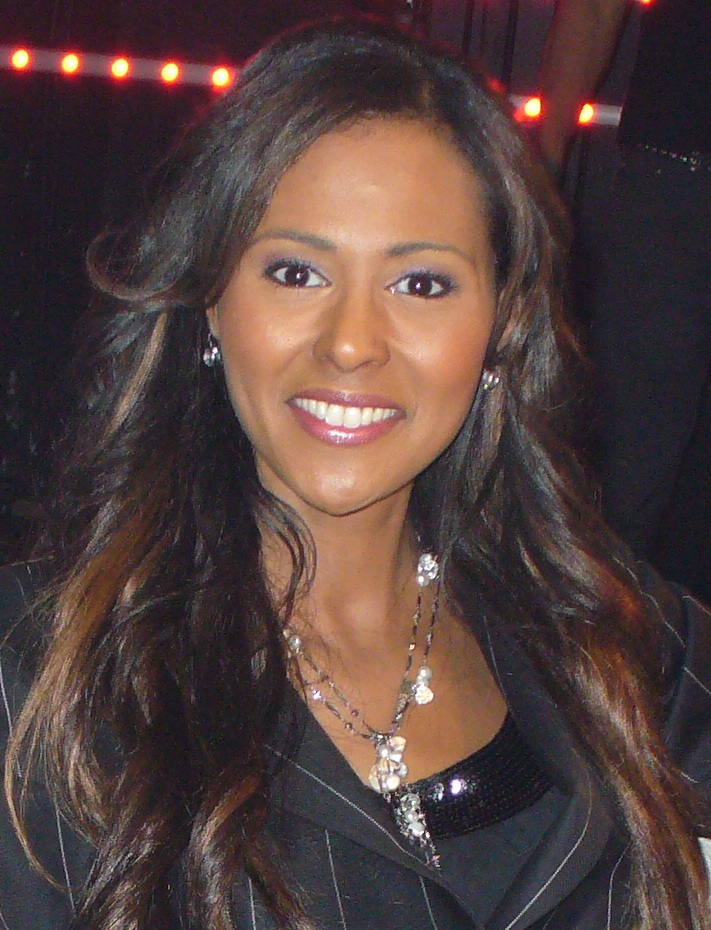
- Born: Anna Hiruth Katarina Sandström Borglund; 20 March 1974 (age 52); Addis Ababa, Ethiopia

Anna Hiruth Katarina Sandström Borglund (born 20 March 1974 in Addis Ababa, Ethiopia) is a Swedish television news presenter and journalist.

She has several times been nominated for and won awards for best news anchor and for best spoken Swedish on television. She has led the evening news broadcast Rapport on SVT since 2000.

In parallel with work on Rapport, Sandström also has participated in major events such as the SVT broadcasts from the Nobel Banquet, One year with the Royal Family (annual broadcast with the Swedish Royal Family on New Year's Eve) and National election coverage in 2006. She has previously worked on the radio news broadcast Dagens Eko ("Echo of the day") and newspaper Västerbotten Folkblad, a local newspaper for northern Sweden.

== Personal life ==
She grew up in the northern Swedish town of Tavelsjö with her brother and twin sister, all born in Ethiopia. In May 2004, she married Tommy Borglund in the Västerbacka chapel in Tavelsjö.
