= Would I Lie to You? =

British TV comedy panel show (2007–present)

- Genre: Comedy; Panel game
- Created by: Peter Holmes
- Directed by: Barbara Wiltshire (2007–2008, 2011–present); David Coyle (2009–2010)
- Presented by: Angus Deayton (2007–2009); Rob Brydon (2009–present)
- Starring: David Mitchell; Lee Mack
- Voices of: David de Keyser; Paul Ridley
- Opening theme: "Bar Fight" by: Craig Joiner; Andrew Welsford; Mervyn Goldsworthy
- Country of origin: United Kingdom
- Original language: English
- No. of series: 19
- No. of episodes: 171 (list of episodes)

Production
- Executive producers: Peter Holmes; Ruth Phillips; Gilly Hall (2011–present)
- Producers: Andrew Westwell (2007–2008); Derek McLean (2007–2009); Fiona McDermott (2009–2010); Rachel Ablett (2011–present); Kate Staples (2011); Stephanie McIntosh (2012–present)
- Production locations: The Fountain Studios (2007); BBC Television Centre (2008); Pinewood Studios (2009–2021, 2023); Elstree Studios (2022)
- Editors: Steve Andrews (2007–2008); Tim Ellison (2007–2008); Bex Murray (2007–2008); Steve Nayler (2009–present); Tom Munden (2011–present)
- Running time: 30 minutes
- Production company: Zeppotron

Original release
- Network: BBC One; ITV (2021 one-off special)
- Release: 16 June 2007 – present

Would I Lie to You? (abbreviated as WILTY) is a British comedy panel show aired on BBC One, made by Zeppotron for the BBC. It was first broadcast on 16 June 2007, starring David Mitchell and Lee Mack as team captains. Originally hosted by Angus Deayton, Rob Brydon has been the host since 2009.

== History ==
The show was hosted by Angus Deayton for the first two series in 2007 and 2008, with Rob Brydon (who had appeared as a guest panellist in the second series) taking over as host in 2009 from the third series onwards. Throughout the entire run of the show, the team captains have been comedians David Mitchell and Lee Mack.

The first series was recorded at Fountain Studios in Wembley during March and April 2007 and aired at 21:55 between 16 June and 28 July 2007 on BBC One (missing a week for coverage of the Concert for Diana memorial event). Filming for the second series took place between 15 November and 18 December 2007. The second series was filmed at BBC Television Centre in White City, West London, because Fountain Studios were being used for The X Factor. The second series aired at 21:00 between 11 July 2008 and 29 August 2008 on BBC One, and contained eight shows, an increase of two from series one. A compilation episode featuring some previously unaired material was aired on 19 September 2008 at 21:30 on BBC One.

Filming of a third series of eight episodes took place at Pinewood Studios during March and April 2009, and was broadcast between 10 August 2009 and 29 September 2009 on BBC One at 22:35. A compilation episode was also recorded. The airdate was 17 December 2009, due to the addition of Match of the Day to the BBC One schedule. Filming of a fourth series of eight episodes took place at Pinewood Studios again during April and May 2010, and was broadcast between 23 July 2010 and 10 September 2010 on BBC One at 22:35. The compilation episode aired on 17 September 2010. The fifth series was filmed during March 2011 and started airing from 9 September at 21:30.

The sixth series of the show was recorded in March 2012 and began its broadcast on 13 April 2012. This series was aired in a pre-watershed slot, at 20:30, for the first time. Series 16 aired on Fridays at 20:00.

== Format ==
For each show, two celebrity guests join each of the team captains. The teams compete as each player reveals unusual facts and embarrassing personal tales for the evaluation of the opposing team. Some of these are true, some are not, and it is the opposing team's task to decide which is which.

=== Rounds ===
In all rounds, the scoring system is the same: teams gain a point for correctly guessing whether a statement is true or not, but if they guess incorrectly the opposing team gets a point. Each episode running time is 30 minutes, so some questions are edited out prior to airing. In addition, the comic format allows each team member to question and joke with the opposing team. Hence, each episode has differing total scoring points reflecting the varying number of questions asked and answered.

During series one through series five, it was impossible for viewers to follow the scores until they were read out at the end of each round, as some questions were edited out, and the final scores reflected the total questions played while filming each episode (not reflecting the final edits for the 30 minute running time). However, starting with series six on, the scores were re-recorded to reflect what had made the aired edits and not the whole filmed recording.

==== Current rounds ====
- "Home Truths": Panellists read out a statement about themselves, from a card which they have not seen prior to recording. The opposing team has to decide whether it is true or false by asking the panellist questions. Much of the comedy in this round derives from the holder of the card having to improvise answers under increasingly detailed questioning. The first series used all six panellists; from the second series onwards, the round tended to focus on the four guests. In series two a 'possessions' element was introduced, in which the panellist takes an item out of a box and reads a statement from a card, and has to convince the opposing team that the possession genuinely belongs to them.
- "This is My...": A guest comes onto the set and is introduced by first name, but remains standing in silence as the round continues. Panellists on one team tell the opposing team about their relationship to the guest; only one account out of three told is genuine, and the opposing team has to work out which it is. At the end of the round, the guest reveals their true identity, and with which of the panellists they have a genuine relationship.
- "Quick-Fire Lies": The second questioning round, with the panellists chosen at random. In earlier series, the panellists were ostensibly under a time limit although no on-screen indicator of the time limit was ever present. The notion of a time limit was eventually dropped in the later series, making the round identical to "Home Truths" in practice. This round usually features – but is not exclusive to – Mitchell and Mack. From the fourth series onwards, Brydon also became an occasional participant, with both teams questioning him at once.

==== Former rounds ====
- "Ring of Truth": A celebrity fact is read out by the host, and each team has to reach a joint decision on whether it is true or false. This was a regular round in the first three series, appeared only occasionally in the fourth series, and was then discontinued.
- "Telly Tales": Clips from a TV show are shown, a statement is read out about the show by a member of one team and the other team has to guess whether it is true or false. This round was only played in the first series.

=== Special episodes ===
Most series have included some special episodes such as:

- Christmas special: these are just like ordinary episodes, except that they are Christmas-themed, and are first broadcast near Christmas.
- Unseen bits and More unseen bits: these are mainly a compilation of truths or lies which were edited out of the regular episodes of the series. Sometimes some bloopers are included as well.
- Best bits: has highlights from the series.
- Seasons 2 and 3 combined Best & Unseen bits into a single episode.

== Cast ==
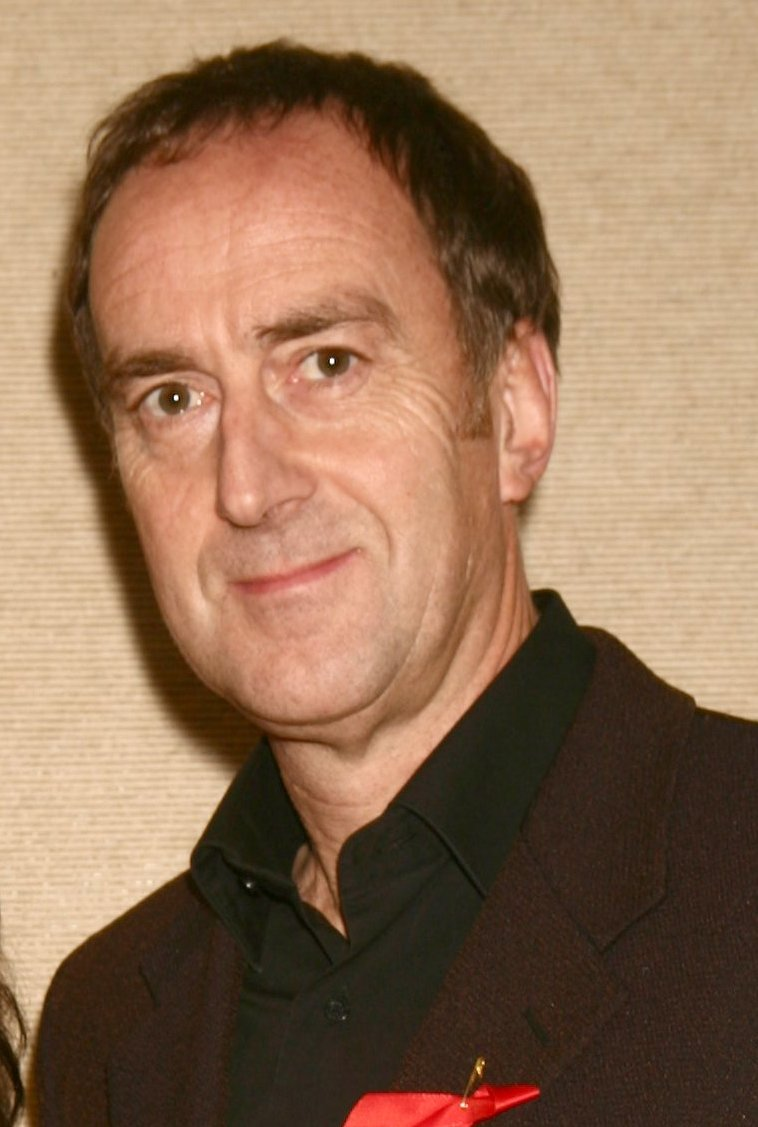
Angus Deayton hosted the first two series.

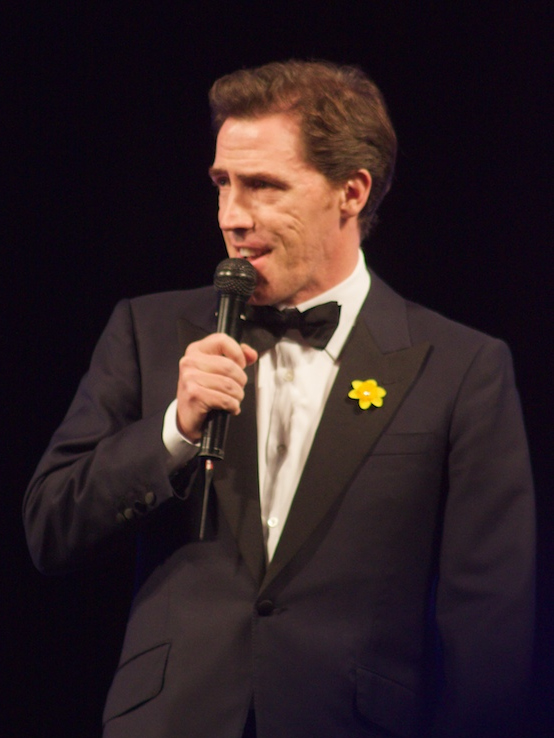
Rob Brydon has hosted every episode from Series 3 onwards.

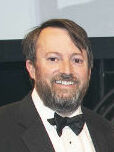
David Mitchell has appeared as a team captain in every episode.

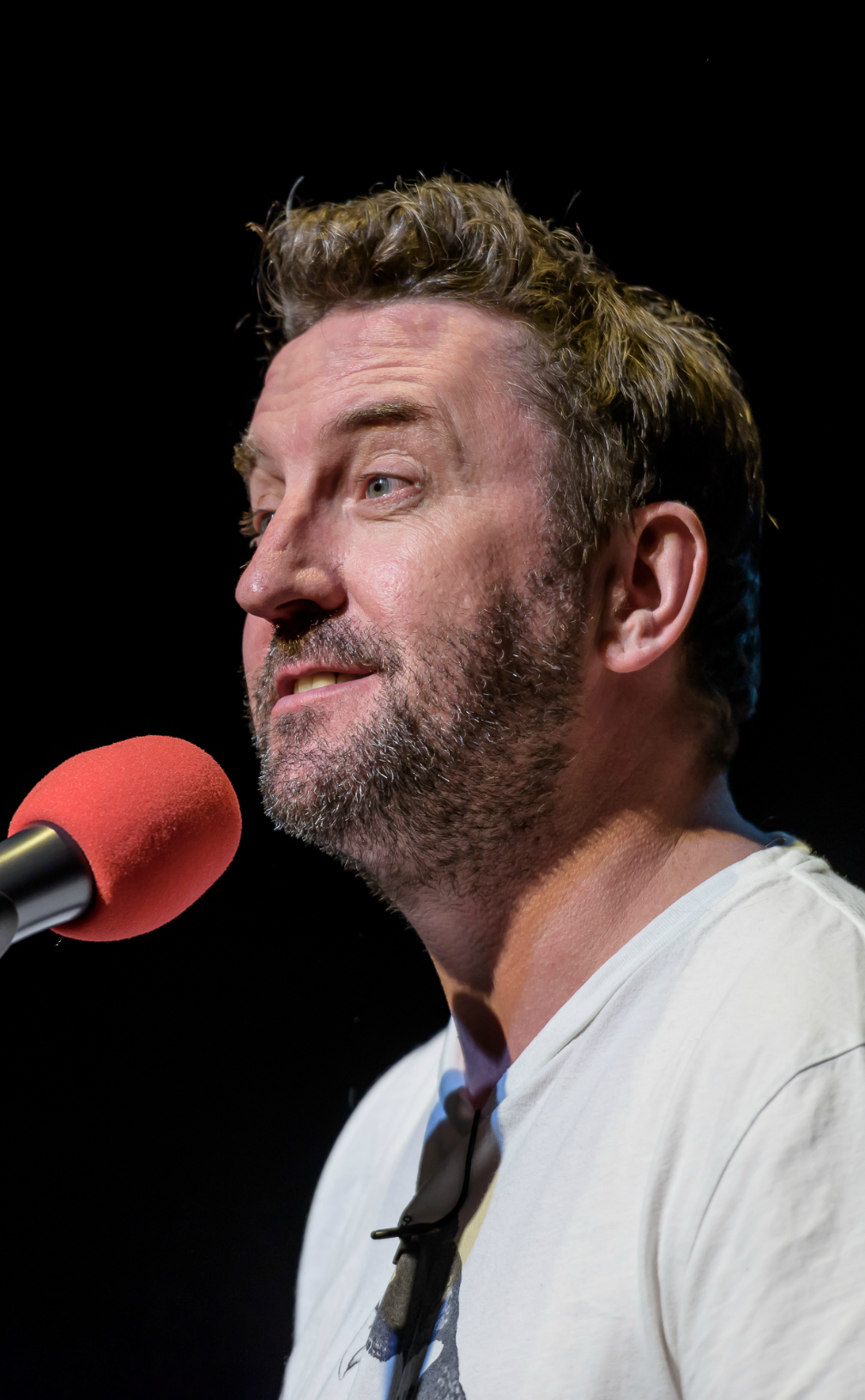
Lee Mack is the other regular team captain on the show.

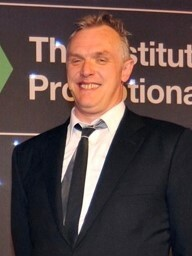
Greg Davies stood in as team captain for Lee Mack during a series 8 episode

=== Guest appearances ===
The following have all appeared multiple times as one of the guest panelists on the show, including any as-yet unbroadcast episodes of Series 20. This does not include the 2011 Comic Relief special.

13 appearances

- Bob Mortimer

11 appearances

- Jo Brand
- Richard Osman

9 appearances

- Rhod Gilbert

8 appearances

- Gabby Logan
- Chris McCausland
- Claudia Winkleman

7 appearances

- Jason Manford
- Henning Wehn

6 appearances

- Alex Jones
- Miles Jupp

5 appearances

- Lucy Beaumont
- Jimmy Carr
- Greg Davies^{[a]}
- Miranda Hart
- Stephen Mangan
- Sarah Millican
- Sara Pascoe

4 appearances

- Frankie Boyle
- Mel Giedroyc
- Dara Ó Briain
- Jon Richardson
- Josh Widdicombe

3 appearances

- James Acaster
- Clare Balding
- Charlie Brooker
- John Cooper Clarke
- Victoria Coren Mitchell
- Hugh Dennis
- Ivo Graham
- Russell Howard
- Harriet Kemsley
- Judi Love
- Joe Lycett
- Shazia Mirza
- Katherine Parkinson
- Romesh Ranganathan
- Lou Sanders
- Jack Whitehall

a. Including an appearance where he substituted for Lee Mack as captain

== Ratings ==
The first show of Series 1 had 3.8 million viewers, a 19% audience share at the time it was broadcast.

The first show of Series 2 had 3 million viewers and a 14% audience share. Later episodes indicated ratings of 2.7–3.2 million, with the final show of the series getting 3.3 million viewers and a 15% audience share.

The first show of Series 3 had 2.8 million viewers, the lowest number for a series opener so far; however, this equated to a 17% audience share. The final show attracted only 2.5 million viewers, but with a 19% audience share overall.

The first show of series 4 had 3.12 million viewers and a 19.7% audience share, the best performance for a series opener since series 1.

The series 5 premiere had the show's highest ratings to date, with 4 million viewers and a 17.2% audience share.

Series 6 began with an audience share of 14.9% and peak viewing figures of 3.53 million. These figures were above the seventh series figures of 2.83 million / 12.8% audience share, although these rose to 3.17 million by the end of the series with a 14.7% share.

== Awards and nominations ==
Ceremony	Year	Award	Nominated work	Result
British Comedy Guide Awards	2010	Best TV Panel Show	WILTY?	Nominated
British Comedy Guide Awards	2011	Best TV Panel Show	WILTY?	Won
British Comedy Guide Awards	2013	Best TV Panel Show	WILTY?	Won
British Comedy Guide Awards	2013	Comedy of the Year	WILTY?	Won
British Comedy Guide Awards	2014	Best TV Panel Show	WILTY?	Won
British Comedy Guide Awards	2015	Best TV Panel Show	WILTY?	Won
British Comedy Guide Awards	2016	Best TV Panel Show	WILTY?	Nominated
British Comedy Guide Awards	2017	Best TV Panel Show	WILTY?	Won
British Comedy Guide Awards	2018	Best TV Panel Show	WILTY?	Won
British Comedy Guide Awards	2019	Best TV Panel Show	WILTY?	Won
British Comedy Guide Awards	2020	Best TV Panel Show	WILTY?	Won
British Comedy Awards	2010	Best Comedy Panel Show	WILTY?	Won
British Comedy Awards	2011	Best Comedy Panel Show	WILTY?	Nominated
British Comedy Awards	2013	Best Comedy Panel Show	WILTY?	Won
British Comedy Awards	2014	Best Comedy Panel Show	WILTY?	Won
British Comedy Awards	2022	Best Comedy Entertainment Series	WILTY?	Nominated
British Comedy Awards	2023	Best Comedy Panel Show	WILTY?	Nominated
British Comedy Awards	2023	Outstanding Male Comedy Entertainment Performance	Lee Mack	Won
British Academy Television Awards	2014	Best Comedy Entertainment Programme	WILTY?	Nominated
British Academy Television Awards	2015	Best Comedy Entertainment Programme	WILTY?	Nominated
British Academy Television Awards	2016	Best Comedy Entertainment Programme	WILTY?	Nominated
British Academy Television Awards	2018	Best Comedy Entertainment Programme	WILTY?	Nominated
British Academy Television Awards	2019	Best Comedy Entertainment Programme	WILTY?	Nominated
British Academy Television Awards	2023	Best Comedy Entertainment Programme	WILTY?	Nominated
British Academy Television Awards	2024	Best Comedy Entertainment Programme	WILTY?	Nominated
British Academy Television Awards	2025	Best Entertainment Programme	WILTY?	Won
British Academy Television Awards	2026	Best Entertainment Programme	WILTY?	Nominated
British Academy Television Awards	2019	Best Entertainment Performance	David Mitchell	Nominated
British Academy Television Awards	2019	Best Entertainment Performance	Lee Mack	Won
British Academy Television Awards	2020	Best Entertainment Performance	Lee Mack	Nominated
British Academy Television Awards	2021	Best Entertainment Performance	David Mitchell	Nominated

== International broadcasts ==
The show airs on ABC TV in Australia and TVNZ 2 in New Zealand and began screening on BBC UKTV in Australia and New Zealand from November 2014. It is available to stream on BritBox in the US and Canada.

== Merchandise ==
- A DVD of the complete fourth series was released in September 2011.
- A board game based on the show was released in 2012, with a second edition with updated prompts following in 2019.
- A DVD of the complete fifth series was released in October 2012.
- A DVD of the complete sixth series was released in October 2013.
- A book based on the series, Would I Lie to You? Presents the 100 Most Popular Lies of All Time, was published in October 2015. The publishers, Faber and Faber, have also ordered a second book.
- Series 4 to 7 were released individually on DVD in Australia across July and August 2015.

== Episodes ==
=== Series ===
Series	Start date	End date	Number of episodes			
Series	Start date	End date	Regular	Christmas	"Unseen bits"	"Best bits"
1	16 June 2007	28 July 2007	6	0	0	0
2	11 July 2008	29 August 2008	8	0	1*	0
3	10 August 2009	28 September 2009	8	0	1*	0
4	23 July 2010	10 September 2010	8	0	1	0
5	9 September 2011	28 October 2011	8	0	1	0
6	13 April 2012	22 June 2012	8	0	1	0
7	3 May 2013	28 June 2013	8	1	1	0
8	12 September 2014	8 January 2015	8	1	1	0
9	31 July 2015	13 January 2016	8	1	1	0
10	2 September 2016	21 October 2016	8	1	1	0
11	20 November 2017	19 January 2018	8	1	1	0
12	12 October 2018	18 January 2019	8	1	1	1
13	18 October 2019	7 February 2020	9	1	2	0
14	8 January 2021	1 March 2021	9	1	1	1
15	7 January 2022	4 March 2022	9	1	1	1
16	6 January 2023	31 March 2023	9	1	2	0
17	29 December 2023	8 March 2024	9	1	2	0
18	23 December 2024	15 March 2025	9	1	1	1
19	26 December 2025	25 May 2026	10	1	1	1

- Series 2 and 3 each combined "Best bits" and "Unseen bits" into a single episode.

=== Specials ===
Date	Title
5 March 2011	24 Hour Panel People Comic Relief Special
18 November 2016	Children in Need: Children's Special

=== Appearances in other media ===
An additional 10-minute feature, titled "Mam, Would I Lie to You?" was broadcast on the ITV show Ant & Dec's Saturday Night Takeaway on 13 March 2021. This edition was hosted by Ant and Dec and featured a team of Lee Mack, Stephen Mulhern and Michelle Visage playing two rounds of a slightly altered "This Is My..." where the panellists had to guess which of the three children was the child of an audience member by the story given. Zeppotron and the BBC were thanked in the programme's credits for use of the WILTY brand and format.

== International versions ==
- A New Zealand version of the show, presented by broadcaster Paul Henry, and featuring team captains Jesse Mulligan and Jon Bridges, began airing on TV3 in 2012. It followed the Rob Brydon era British format closely but was short-lived.
- A short-lived Croatian version of this show titled Ma lažeš! (lit. 'You're Lying!') presented by Rene Bitorajac and featuring team captains Luka Bulić and Jan Kerekeš aired on RTL from 2021 until 2022.
- The Czech version of this show Copak bych vám lhal? (lit. 'How Could I Lie to You?') presented by Igor Bareš and featuring Sandra Pogodová and Michal Dlouhý as team captains was to be broadcast from January 2013 on ČT, a public television broadcaster.
- The Icelandic version, Satt eða logið? (lit. 'Truth or lie?'), began airing in 2017 on Stöð 2. Originally presented by Logi Bergmann Eiðsson who was succeeded by Benedikt Valsson in the second season, team captains are Auðunn Blöndal and Katla Margét Þorgeirsdóttir.
- The Slovak version, Klamal by som ti? (lit. 'Would I Lie to You?'), presented by singer/actor Filip Tůma and featuring Petra Polnišová and Zuzana Šebová, actresses, as team captains, began airing in March 2019 on Markíza.
- An Australian version of the show aired for two seasons on Network 10, beginning on 28 February 2022. It was presented by Chrissie Swan, with Chris Taylor and Frank Woodley as team captains. Taylor was replaced by Charlie Pickering in the second season.
- An American version of the show premiered on The CW on April 9, 2022.
- A Ukrainian version, Vpiznai brekhniu (lit. 'Recognize the lie'), is set to premiere on the streaming platform Sweet.tv in the spring of 2026. It will be presented by Timur Miroshnychenko, with Kostiantyn Trembovetskyi and Roman Shcherban as team captains.
- A Danish version, Bukserne de flyver (lit. 'The pants they fly') started airing on TV 2 on 29 August 2026.

Country	Title	Network	Host(s)	Team captains	Date aired
Australia	Would I Lie to You?	Network 10	Chrissie Swan	Chris Taylor (1); Frank Woodley (1-2); Charlie Pickering (2)	2022–2023
Croatia	Ma lažeš!	RTL	Rene Bitorajac	Luka Bulić; Jan Kerekeš	2021–2022
Czech Republic	Copak bych vám lhal?	ČT1	Igor Bareš	Sandra Pogodová; Michal Dlouhý	2013
Denmark	Bukserne de flyver	TV 2	Casper Christensen	Heino Hansen; Mikael Bertelsen	2026–present
Estonia	Kelle suu suitseb?	Kanal 2	Priit Loog	Urmas Vaino; Mart Normet	2025
Iceland	Satt eða logið?	Stöð 2	Logi Bergmann Eiðsson (1); Benedikt Valsson (2)	Auðunn Blöndal; Katla Margét Þorgeirsdóttir	2017–2018
Malaysia	Betul ke bohong?	Astro Warna	AC Mizal (2012–2015); Johan (2015–2017); Ozlynn Waty (2017)	Various	2012–2017
Netherlands	Sterke verhalen	BNNVARA	Sanne Wallis de Vries	Peter Pannekoek; Richard Groenendijk	2018–2019
New Zealand	Would I Lie to You?	TV3	Paul Henry	Jesse Mulligan; Jon Bridges	2012
Slovakia	Klamal by som ti?	Markíza	Filip Tůma	Petra Polnišová; Zuzana Šebová	2019
Sweden	Tror du jag ljuger?	SVT 1	Anna Mannheimer	Fredrik Lindström; Johan Glans	2016–2019
Ukraine	Впізнай брехню (Vpiznai brekhniu)	Sweet.tv	Timur Miroshnychenko	Kostiantyn Trembovetskyi; Roman Shcherban	2026
United States	Would I Lie to You?	The CW	Aasif Mandvi	Matt Walsh; Sabrina Jalees	2022

== See also ==
- Call My Bluff, had a similar format, choosing the truth between three word definitions rather than personal stories
- Would You Believe?, 1970s Australian TV series with a similar format
- To Tell the Truth, American TV panel show
