= Bengt Öste =

Swedish television presenter (1927–2004)

- Born: Bengt Alfred Öste; 22 January 1927; Stockholm, Sweden
- Died: 5 June 2004 (aged 77); Stockholm, Sweden
- Other name: "Mr Rapport"
- Occupations: Journalist, TV host
- Spouses: Ann-Margret Holmgren (m. 1950, divorced) Gertrud Goldbeck-Löwe (m. 1956)

Bengt Alfred Öste (22 January 1927 – 5 June 2004) was a Swedish journalist and television host. He was the news anchor of Rapport in Sveriges Television (SVT) for 14 years, from 1978 to 1992. Before that, he was news chief from 1972. Öste was also a devoted fisherman and wrote both books and articles on the subject.

== Early life ==
Öste was born on 22 January 1927 in Bromma Parish, Stockholm, Sweden, the son of the journalist and the writer Alfred Öste and his wife Giggi Ahlström. He was the brother of the journalist and writer Sven Öste. His grandfather was the veterinarian Rudolf Ahlström and grandmother was the politician Nathalia Osberg. Öste passed studentexamen in Sigtuna in 1945.

== Career ==
Öste's first job as a reporter was for Östergötlands Dagblad which later amalgamated into Norrköpings Tidningar. He worked as a reporter, edition manager and assistant editorial secretary at Svenska Dagbladet between 1947 and 1963. Öste was executive editor and publisher as well as administrative editor-in-chief for Idun–Vecko-Journalen from 1963 to 1966 as well as research editor at Svenska Dagbladet in 1966. He was deputy editor-in-chief there from 1967 to 1969, head of interior affairs from 1969 to 1970, editorial secretary at TV2 at Sveriges Television from 1971 to 1974, news director of TV2 from 1975 to 1978 and news anchor of Rapport in TV2 from 1978 to 1992. In the mid-1990s, Öste moved to TV3 where he hosted Dagar som skakade Sverige together with Hasse Aro.

Öste was also a devoted fisherman and wrote both books and articles on the subject. Later he led the successful television program Visst nappar det at Sveriges Television. The program became so popular that in 2001, Öste received an award from Sportfiskeforum ("Forum for recreational fishing") in Älvkarleby, which awarded the Hallman Prize of SEK 10,000 to Öste.

== Personal life ==
In 1950, Öste married Ann-Margret Holmgren (1931–2015), the daughter of chief physician Björn Holmgren and Margareta Blixen-Finecke. Öste and Holmgren had two children: Jonas (born 1951) and Marie (born 1953).

In 1956, Öste married Gertrud Goldbeck-Löwe (1932–2016), the daughter of physician Hans-Adolf Goldbeck-Löwe and Hertha Goldbeck-Löwe from West Germany. Öste and Goldbeck-Löwe had two children: Viveca (born 1958) and Giggi (born 1960).

On 20 June 1983, Öste's daughters Gigi and Marie, nine months pregnant, were out walking in Tyresö when they were mowed down by a drunk driver. Marie lost little Milja, Gigi was forced to amputate her right leg and suffered severe brain damage for life. Öste and his wife got involved in Hjärnkraft ("Brain power"), an association for the rehabilitation of brain-damaged people. They also started the KRAM association, (Kampen mot rattfylleriet angår mig, "The fight against drunk driving concerns me"). It was largely thanks to Öste's determined fight that the limit for drunk driving in Sweden was lowered to 0.2 per mille (promille).

When the debate against smoking became more and more heated, the pipe smoker Öste took the lead in favor of tolerance. In the early 1990s, he became a figurehead for the association Smokepeace, which worked for the rights of smokers in society. The organization later attracted controversy, not least after Aftonbladet revealed that the tobacco company Philip Morris gave Smokepeace SEK 1.2 million for an advertising campaign.

== Illness and death ==
Öste slowly began to fall ill in 1996. The doctors discovered a benign tumor which was operated on. His memory began to fail and he was finally diagnosed with Alzheimer's-like dementia. His final years, Öste spent at Saint Erik's nursing home, which has group housing for people with dementia. He died on 5 June 2004 at Saint Göran Hospital in Kungholm Parish, Stockholm, Sweden. He was interred on 27 May 2005 at Skogskyrkogården in Stockholm.

== Selected bibliography ==
- Öste, Bengt; Tham, Ulla; Albertsson, Johan; Båth, Måns (2002). Abborren: från sjön till festmåltiden (in Swedish) (2nd ed.). Stockholm: Bäckström. ISBN 9189394097. SELIBR 8449976.
- Öste, Bengt; Johnson, Gunnar (1995). Visst nappar det - mest på fluga!: nya knep och kåserier av TV:s fiskeexpert (in Swedish). Stockholm: Sveriges radio. ISBN 9152217337. SELIBR 7409664.
- Öste, Bengt; Tham, Ulla (1995). Abbor (in Norwegian). Oslo: Landbruksforl. ISBN 82-529-1808-5. SELIBR 7302099.
- Öste, Bengt; Tham, Ulla; Albertsson, Johan; Båth, Måns (1993). Abborren: från sjön till festmåltiden (in Swedish). Stockholm: PM Bäckström. ISBN 9188016145. SELIBR 7768209.
- Öste, Bengt; Johnson, Gunnar (1989). Så flugfiskar du. Fiskeboken, 99-0299686-8 (in Swedish) (New ed.). Stockholm: Sportfiskarna. ISBN 91-86786-15-6. SELIBR 7760555.
- Öste, Bengt; Johnson, Gunnar (1986). Visst nappar det!: [TV:s fiskeexpert avslöjar sina bästa knep] (in Swedish). Stockholm: Sveriges radio i samarbete med Sportfiskarna. ISBN 9152216519. SELIBR 7409622.
- Johnson, Gunnar; Klippinge, Pelle; Birkesten, Olle; Öste, Bengt (1985). Svenskt fiskes flugbindarskola (in Swedish) (3rd ed.). Stockholm: Sportfiskarna. SELIBR 787569.
- Öste, Bengt; Johnson, Gunnar (1982). Så flugfiskar du (in Swedish). Stockholm: Rabén & Sjögren i samarbete med Fritidsfiskarna. ISBN 9129560357. SELIBR 7235322.
- Nilsson, Olle W.; Smedman, Rolf; Öste, Bengt (1981). Fluefiske. Cappelens håndbøker (in Norwegian). Oslo: Cappelen. ISBN 82-02-04844-3. SELIBR 7169946.
- Nilsson, Olle W.; Smedman, Rolf; Öste, Bengt (1980). Vill du fiska fluga? (in Swedish). Stockholm: Rabén & Sjögren. ISBN 91-29-53563-8. SELIBR 7234590.
- Öste, Bengt (1971). Med fluga i stilla vatten. Fritidsfiskarnas special; 2 (in Swedish). Stockholm: Sveriges fritidsfiskares riksförb. SELIBR 1505861.
- Öste, Bengt; Rydén, Sven (1965). Dagbok från fiskevatten (in Swedish). Stockholm: Geber. SELIBR 870988.
