= Henning Wehn =

German comedian

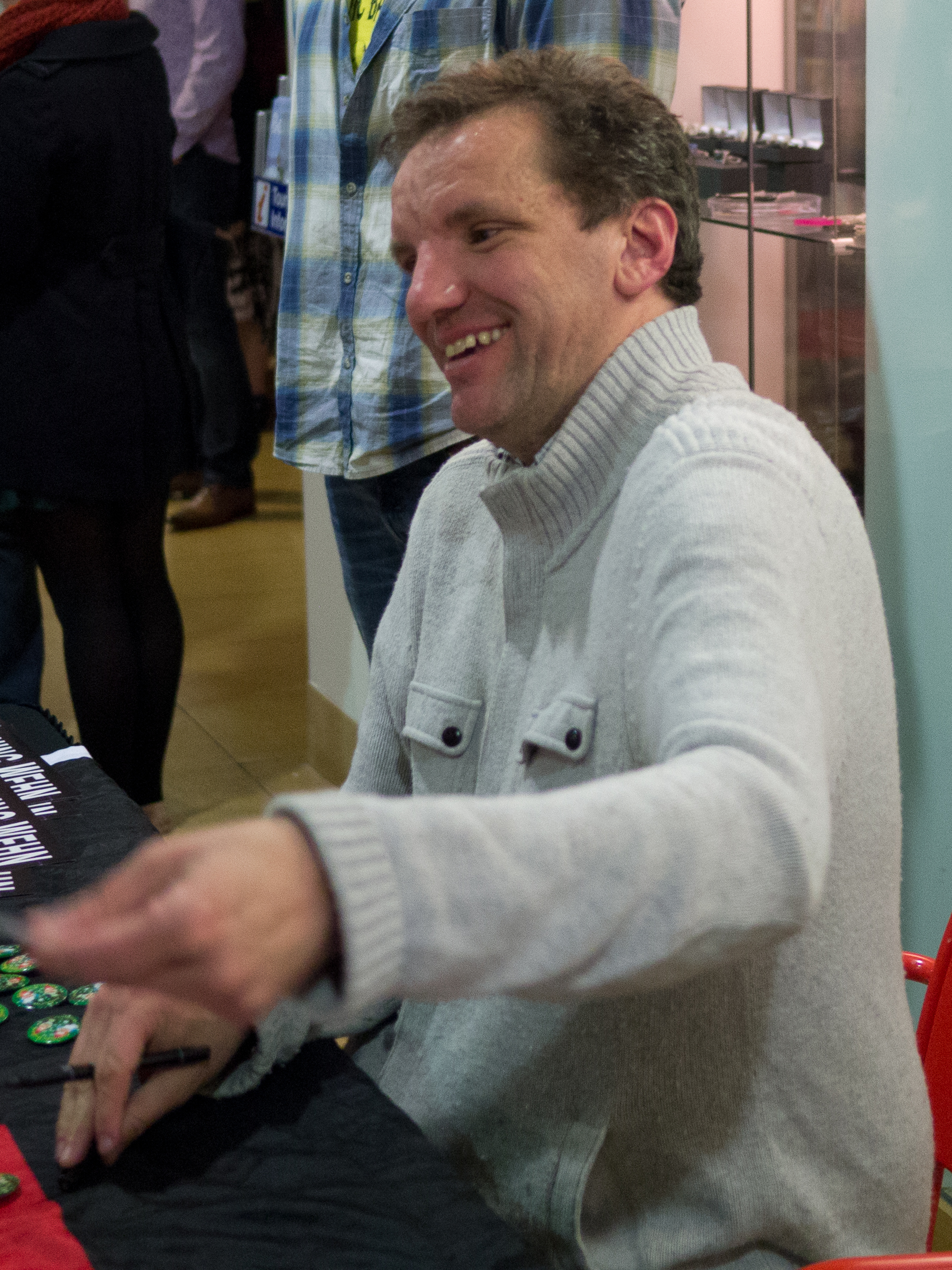
- Wehn in 2013
- Born: 10 April 1974 (age 52); Hagen, West Germany
- Education: University of Münster

Comedy career
- Years active: c. 2003 – present
- Medium: Stand-up, television, radio
- Website: henningwehn.de

Henning Wehn (German pronunciation: [ˈhɛnɪŋ ˈveːn]; born 10 April 1974) is a German stand-up comedian based in the UK.

== Career ==
Wehn studied Business Administration in Münster and worked in customer relations. In 2002, he moved to the United Kingdom to work in the marketing department of Wycombe Wanderers. One evening, he saw an open mic night and decided to try comedy. Of his decision to stay in the UK, Wehn later wrote:

I initially planned to stay in the UK for only 12 months to improve my English, but the good weather, the tasty food and the classy women made me stay. In order to blend in with the locals, I decided to get extremely lazy, spend money I don't have and, most importantly, to unjustifiably bang on about my great sense of humour. This is why I decided 1,646 days, nine hours and 42 minutes ago to try my hand at stand-up and become the German Comedy Ambassador.

As a result, since October 2003, Wehn has been the self-styled "German Comedy Ambassador in London". After beginning his career as warm-up act to various comedians in London (including Stewart Lee for Comedy Vehicle), he now has his own act on the British comedy circuit.

Wehn has appeared on the panel shows 8 Out of 10 Cats, Have I Got News for You, Room 101, 8 Out of 10 Cats Does Countdown, QI and Would I Lie to You?. He also appeared on Channel 4's political discussion/comedy show 10 O'Clock Live in May 2013. He is a recurring panellist on both the BBC Radio 5 Live comedy sports show Fighting Talk and on the Radio 4 panel game The Unbelievable Truth. Wehn also appeared as a panellist on the 2015, 2016 and 2017 series of The Great British Bake Off: An Extra Slice for both the BBC and Channel 4.

He appeared on Would I Lie To You?, Episode 7 of Series 7, in which he revealed that for three weeks in the mid-1990s he was listed as a missing person by Interpol. He later appeared on Episode 9 of Series 9, in which he revealed that he and his friend were once arrested by border guards for illegally entering the Czech Republic in the mid-1990s.

In 2014, Wehn and fellow comedian Mark Watson fronted a travelogue in Brazil called The Road to Rio for TV channel Dave. In the show, they explored the country's sporting culture, tying in with the 2014 World Cup held in the country. Henning has often toured and performed with fellow German comedian Otto Kuhnle. Kuhnle appeared on Wehn's BBC Radio 2 series Henning Knows Best in 2012.

In May 2015, Wehn presented An Immigrant's Guide to Britain on Channel 4, telling Radio Times: "[W]hat I really like about the programme it mixes light-hearted issues (the job market), with more serious ones (trouble of having two water taps instead of just one) to the ultra serious (the British class system)". In October that same year, Wehn was the presenter of the BBC World Service radio documentary Wall in the Head in which he explored "the invisible cultural and psychological divide" between East and West Germans 25 years after German reunification following the fall of the Berlin Wall.

In October 2018, Wehn appeared in the German episode of History's TV series Al Murray: Why Does Everyone Hate The English alongside host Al Murray.

== Approach to comedy ==
Wehn's comedy frequently employs common stereotypes about Germans, with critic Brian Logan noting in The Guardian in 2015: "Wehn has made a career out of sending up and celebrating German stereotypes. But that particular ingredient is lower in the new show's mix – with abundant TV and radio credits to his name, Wehn is now well enough established to joke not only about who he is, but what he thinks".

== Political views ==
Wehn's views have been described as "on the right" by The Times and by Richard Wilson, executive producer of Have I Got News for You. In an article analysing left-wing stand-up comedy, Stewart Lee describes Wehn as occupying "[a] broadly libertarian position".

== List of tours ==
- My Struggle (2011)
- No Surrender (2012–2013)
- Henning Knows Bestest (2013–2014)
- Eins Zwei DIY (2015–2016)
- Westphalia Is Not an Option (2016–2017)
- Das Neuen Materialen Nachten (2018; Work in progress)
- Get on with It! (2018–)
- It’ll All Come Out in the Wash (2022)
- Acid Wehn (2024)
