= Katia Elliott =

Swedish journalist (born 1970)

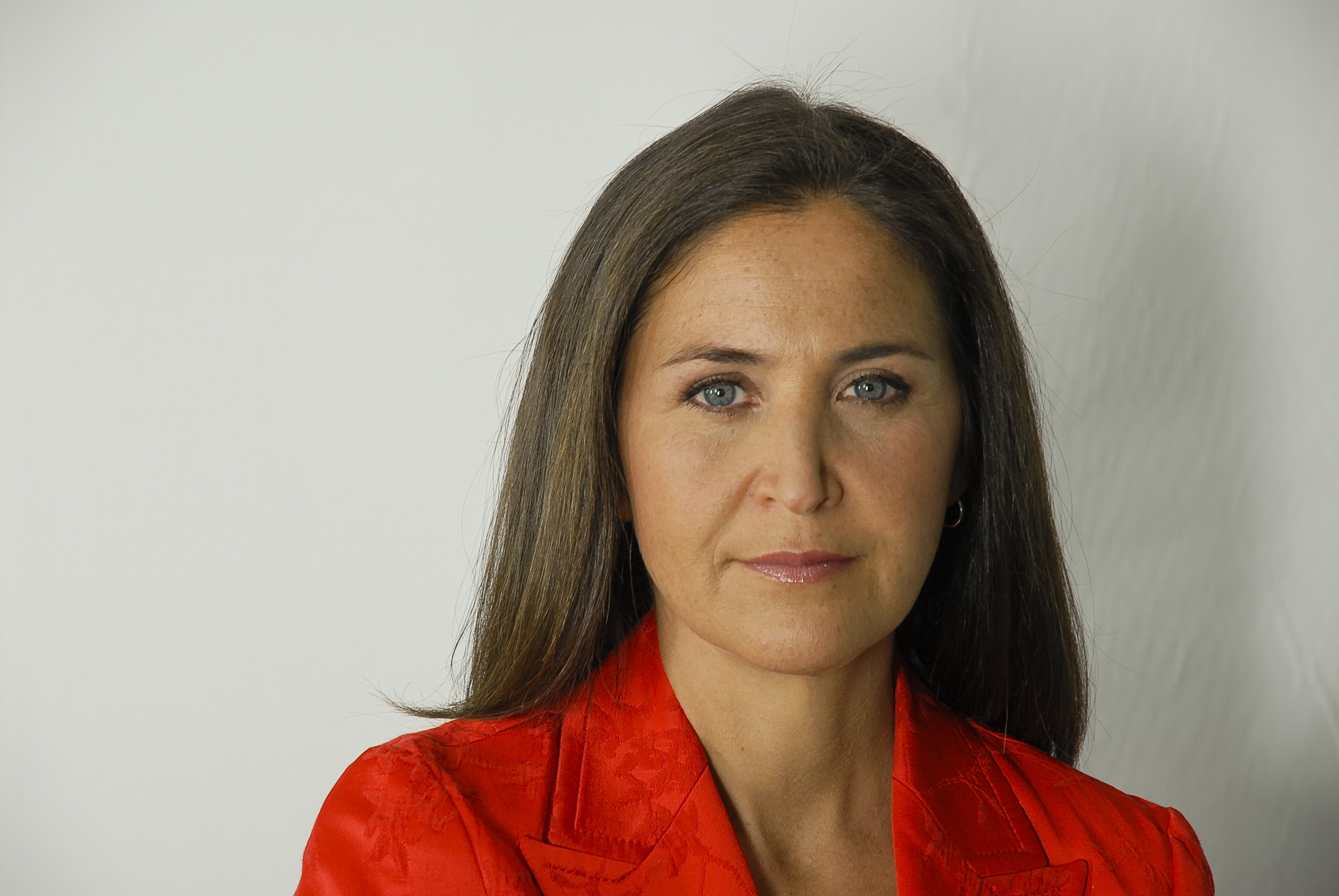
- Katia Elliott
- Born: 23 April 1970 (age 56); Santiago de Chile

Katia Valentina Elliott (briefly known as Elliott Bendz; born 23 April 1970) is a Swedish journalist. Elliott became known as the presenter of the show Go'kväll on SVT in 2002.

Since 2006 Katia Elliott works at SVT Nyheter, she works mostly as a science journalist but has also presented several of SVTs news shows. Elliott is an educated dentist after graduating from Karolinska Institutet. She studied journalism at Stockholm University.
