= Carina Bergfeldt =

Swedish reporter, columnist and author

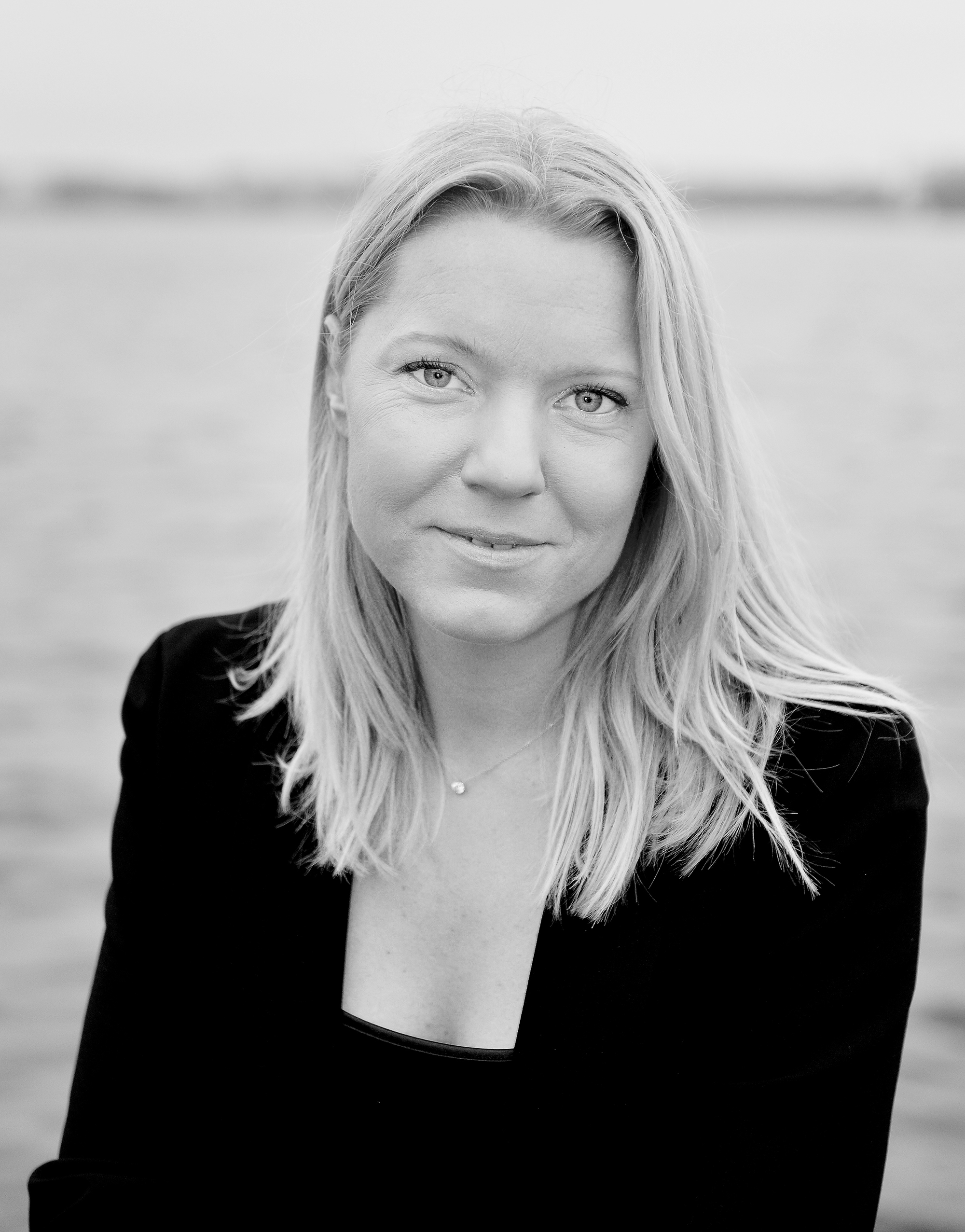
- Bergfeldt in 2014
- Born: February 19, 1980 (age 46)
- Employer: Sveriges Television
- Awards: Stora Journalistpriset

Barbro Carina Bergfeldt (born 19 February 1980) is a Swedish journalist, reporter, columnist and author. In March 2016, she became SVT's correspondent to Washington, D.C. until 2020 when she got her own talkshow with the same name as herself.

After airing ten seasons, SVT announced on 3 February 2026 that the programme would be paused at the end of its current season. The final episode of the tenth season was scheduled to air on 13 March 2026. According to SVT, it is unclear if and when the show will return, and a decision on its future will be made at a later date. In a statement on social media, Bergfeldt expressed pride in the series and the conversations it has facilitated. SVT described 2026 as a “budget year,” stating that even successful programmes may be paused as part of its mandate to explore new formats.

In 2012, Bergfeldt was awarded the Stora Journalistpriset in the category Storyteller of the Year for her report "Dagen vi aldrig glömmer" about the Utøya massacre in July 2011.

== Bibliography ==
- Bergfeldt, Carina (2012). Fadersmord. Stockholm: Frank. ISBN 978-91-979573-5-9
- Rasismen i Sverige (anthology, 2014)
- Bergfeldt, Carina (2015). Sju dagar kvar att leva. Stockholm: Norstedt. ISBN 9789113066967
- Bergfeldt, Carina (2015). Fotografiet. Bookmark Förlag. ISBN 9789187441370
