= List of people with surname Hearn =

Notable individuals with the surname Hearn, Hearne, Hearns or Hearnes include:

== A ==
- Adrian Hearn (1920–1993), Australian rules footballer
- Alec Hearne (1863–1952), English cricketer
- Alex Hearne (born 1993), English cricketer
- Amber Hearn (born 1984), New Zealand soccer player
- Ann Hearn (born 1953), American actress
- Annie Hearn, English arsenic poisoner
- Anthony C. Hearn, Australian-American computer scientist
- Azeline Hearne (c.1825–1890?), American slave and litigator
- Azizi Hearn (born 1999), American football player

== B ==
- Barry Hearn (born 1948), English sports promoter
- Betty Cooper Hearnes (born 1927), American politician
- Bill Hearn (1914–1949), Australian rules footballer
- Billy Ray Hearn (1929–2015), American music producer
- Bob Hearn, American ultramarathoner, computer scientist, and recreational mathematician
- Brett Hearn (born 1958), American stock car driver
- Bunny Hearn (1891–1959), American baseball player and scout
- Bunny Hearn (1920s pitcher) (1904–1974), American baseball player

== C ==
- Cathy Hearn (born 1958), American slalom kayaker
- Charles J. Hearn (1931–2003), American judge
- Charley Hearn (born 1983), English footballer
- Chick Hearn (1916–2002), American sportscaster
- Ciaran Hearn (born 1985), Canadian rugby union player
- Clarrie Hearn (1905–1981), Australian rules footballer
- Clint Calvin Hearn (1866–1928), American Army officer
- Conor Hearne (born 1998), Irish hurler

== D ==
- Daniel Hearne (died 1766), Irish priest
- David Hearn (disambiguation), several people
- Dennis Walter Hearne, American diplomat
- Dixon Hearne (born 1948), American educator and writer

== E ==
- Edgar Hearn (1929–1983), British boxer
- Edward Hearn or Hearne (disambiguation), several people
- Elle Hearns (born 1986/1987), American transgender rights activist

== F ==
- Fil Hearn (born 1938), American architectural and art historian
- Frank Hearne (1858–1949), English-South African cricketer

== G ==
- George Hearn or Hearne (disambiguation), several people
- Glenn Hearn (1914–1978), American politician
- Graham Hearne (born 1937), British businessman
- Grant Hearn, British businessman and public servant

== H ==
- Harry Hearn (1890–1956), Australian politician and businessman
- Herbert Hearne (1862–1906), English cricketer
- Horace Hearne (1892–1962), English barrister and judge
- Hughie Hearne (1873–1932), American baseball player

== J ==
- J. T. Hearne (1867–1944), English cricketer
- J. W. Hearne (1891–1965), English cricketer
- James Hearn (born 1976), English singer-songwriter
- Jean Hearn (1921–2017), Australian politician and trade unionist
- Jeff Hearn (born 1947), British sociologist
- Jim Hearn (1921–1998), American baseball player
- John Hearn or Hearne (disambiguation), several people
- Joy Hearn (born 1958), American politician
- Joyce Hearn (1929–2021), American politician

== K ==
- Karen Hearn, British art historian and curator
- Karl R. Hearne, Canadian director and screenwriter
- Karyn Hearn Slover (1972–1996), American murder victim
- Kaye Gorenflo Hearn (born 1950), American judge
- Kevin Hearn (born 1969), Canadian musician
- Kevin Hearne (born 1970), American novelist

== L ==
- Lacey Hearn (1881–1969), American athlete
- Lachlan Hearne (born 2000), Australian cricketer
- Lafcadio Hearn (1850–1904), Irish-Greek-Japanese writer, translator and teacher
- Liam Hearn (born 1985), English football coach and player
- Loyola Hearn (born 1943), Canadian diplomat and politician
- Lydia Cromwell Hearne (1874-1961), American physician and civic leader

== M ==
- Mary Hearn (1891–1969), Irish gynaecologist
- Mary Hearne (fl. 1718), British novelist
- Maurie Hearn (1912–2004), Australian rules footballer
- Michael Hearn or Hearne (disambiguation), several people
- Milton Hearn (born 1943), Australian chemist
- Murray Hearn (1898–1954), American lawyer, politician and judge

== P ==
- Pat Hearn (1955–2000), American art dealer
- Pat Hearne (died 1859), American gambler and sportsman
- Peter Hearn (1925–2013), English cricketer
- Peter Hearne (1927–2014), British engineer

== R ==
- Reggie Hearn (born 1991), American basketball player
- Richard Hearn (1890–1987), Canadian engineer
- Richard Hearne (1908–1979), English actor and comedian
- Richie Hearn (born 1971), American racing driver
- Robert Hearn (died 1952), Irish Anglican Bishop
- Ronald Hearns (born 1978), American boxer
- Rory Hearne, Irish academic and politician
- Roy Hearn (1908–1978), Australian rules footballer
- Ruby Puryear Hearn (born 1940), American biophysicist

== S ==
- Samuel Hearne (1745–1792), English explorer and fur-trader
- Séamus Hearne (1932–2008), Irish hurler
- Sid Hearn (1899–1963), English cricketer
- Sue Hearn (born 1956), Australian dressage rider

== T ==
- Taylor Hearn (disambiguation), several people
- Ted Hearne (born 1982), American composer, singer and conductor
- Thomas Hearn or Hearne (disambiguation), several people
- Thomas Hearns (born 1958), American boxer
- Tony Hearn (born 1929), British trade union leader
- Tony Hearn (rugby league) (born 1969), Australian rugby league footballer
- Travis Hearnes (born 2005), Norwegian footballer

== V ==
- Vicki Hearne (1946–2001), American author and animal trainer

== W ==
- Walter Hearne (1864–1925), English cricketer
- Walter Risley Hearn (1853–1930), British diplomat
- Warren E. Hearnes (1923–2009), American politician
- Wayne Hearn (born 1962), American tennis player
- William Hearn (disambiguation), several people

== See also ==
- Hearn (disambiguation)
- Hearn family
- Hern
- Herne (surname)
- Ahern
- Ahearn
