= Ahern =

Ahern, also Aherne (Irish: Ó hEachtighearna/Ó hEachthairn, meaning "descendant of Eachthighearna") is an Irish surname. Variants of the surname include Ahearn(e) and Hearn(e). There are 2718 people with the surname Ahern in Ireland, and 1404 people in the United Kingdom. The variant Aherne is borne by 1480 people in Ireland and 919 people in the United Kingdom.

According to historian C. Thomas Cairney, the O'Ahernes were one of the chiefly families of the Dal gCais or Dalcassians, who were a tribe of the Erainn, who were the second wave of Celts to settle in Ireland between about 500 and 100 BC.

Notable people with the surname include:

== Members of the political Ahern family in Ireland ==
- Bertie Ahern (born 1951), former Taoiseach (prime minister) of Ireland
  - Cecelia Ahern (born 1981), author, daughter of Bertie Ahern
  - Maurice Ahern (born 1938/39), Irish politician, former Lord Mayor of Dublin, brother of Bertie
  - Noel Ahern (born 1944), Irish politician, brother of Bertie

== Other people ==
- Aoife Ahern, Dean of Engineering at University College, Dublin
- Brian Aherne (1902–1986), English actor
- Caroline Aherne (1963–2016), English comedian
- Cornelius Ahern (1871–1955), Australian politician
- Dan Ahern (1898–1963), American football player
- David Ahern (1947–1988), Australian avant-garde composer
- Dermot Ahern (born 1955), Irish Minister for Justice, Equality and Law Reform
- Francis J. Ahern (1899–1958), San Francisco Police Chief 1956–58
- Fred Ahern (disambiguation), several people
- Garry Ahern (1949/1950–2025), New Zealand sports journalist
- Gene Ahern (1895–1960), American comic-strip artist
- Jayson P. Ahern, U.S. Customs Agency commissioner
- Jerry Ahern (1946–2012), American science fiction author
- John Ahern (disambiguation), several people
- Kathy Ahern (1949–1996), American golfer
- Kit Ahern (1915–2007), Irish politician
- Lassie Lou Ahern (1920–2018), American actress
- Liam Ahern (1916–1974), Irish politician
- Lizzie Ahern (1877–1969), political activist and socialist from Australia
- Mary Eileen Ahern (1860–1938), American librarian
- Mary V. Ahern (1922–2021), American radio and television producer
- Michael Ahearne (born 1966), American professor of marketing
- Michael Ahern (disambiguation), several people
- Miriam Ahern (born 1954), Irish charity patron
- Nuala Ahern (born 1949), Irish politician
- Peggy Ahern (1917–2012), American actress
- Pat Aherne (1901–1970), English actor
- Steve Ahern (born 1959), Australian media consultant
- Steven Dale Ahern (1946–2011), American gay pornographic actor and whistleblower
- Tom Aherne (1919–1999), Irish footballer and hurler
- Thomas Ahern (businessman) (1884–1970), Western Australian businessman
- Thomas Ahern (rugby union) (born 2000), Irish rugby union player
- Valerie Ahern, American television screenwriter and producer

== Other uses ==
In the same way that the onomatopoeic expression "rhubarb-rhubarb" was used to represent the sounds uttered by members of the British House of Commons, "hearn-hearn" was often used in the Goon Show to represent the sounds uttered by speakers of US English (e.g., The Sleeping Prince).

The Irish sept of Ahearn/Ahern descends from Echthighern mac Cennétig.

== See also ==
- Ahearn
- Hearn (disambiguation)
- Irish clans
