= Herne =

Herne may refer to:

== Places ==
=== Australia ===
- Herne Hill, Victoria
- Herne Hill, Western Australia, a suburb of Perth
- Riverwood, New South Wales, formerly known as Herne Bay

=== England ===
- Herne, Kent, near the town of Herne Bay
- Herne Bay, seaside town located in southeastern Kent
- Herne Common, Kent
- Herne Hill in London

=== Elsewhere ===
- Herne, Belgium
- Herne, North Rhine-Westphalia, Germany
- Herne Bay, New Zealand, a suburb of Auckland

== Other uses ==
- Herne (surname)
- Herne the Hunter, an English mythological figure said to haunt Windsor Forest

== See also ==
- Ahearn
- Aherne
- Hearn (disambiguation)
- Herne Bay (disambiguation)
- Hernes
