= Charles Hearn =

Charles Hearn may refer to:

- Charles Hearn, 2015 founder of fintech company Alloy
- Charles J. Hearn (1931–2003), Texas state judge

== See also ==
- Charley Hearn (born 1983), English footballer
