= Aoife =

- Pronunciation: English: /ˈiːfə/ EE-fə; Irish: [ˈiːfʲə]

Origin
- Language: Goidelic languages
- Meaning: "beautiful, radiant"
- Region of origin: Ireland

Other names
- Variant forms: Aífe, Aeife
- Related names: from Aífe (Aeife)

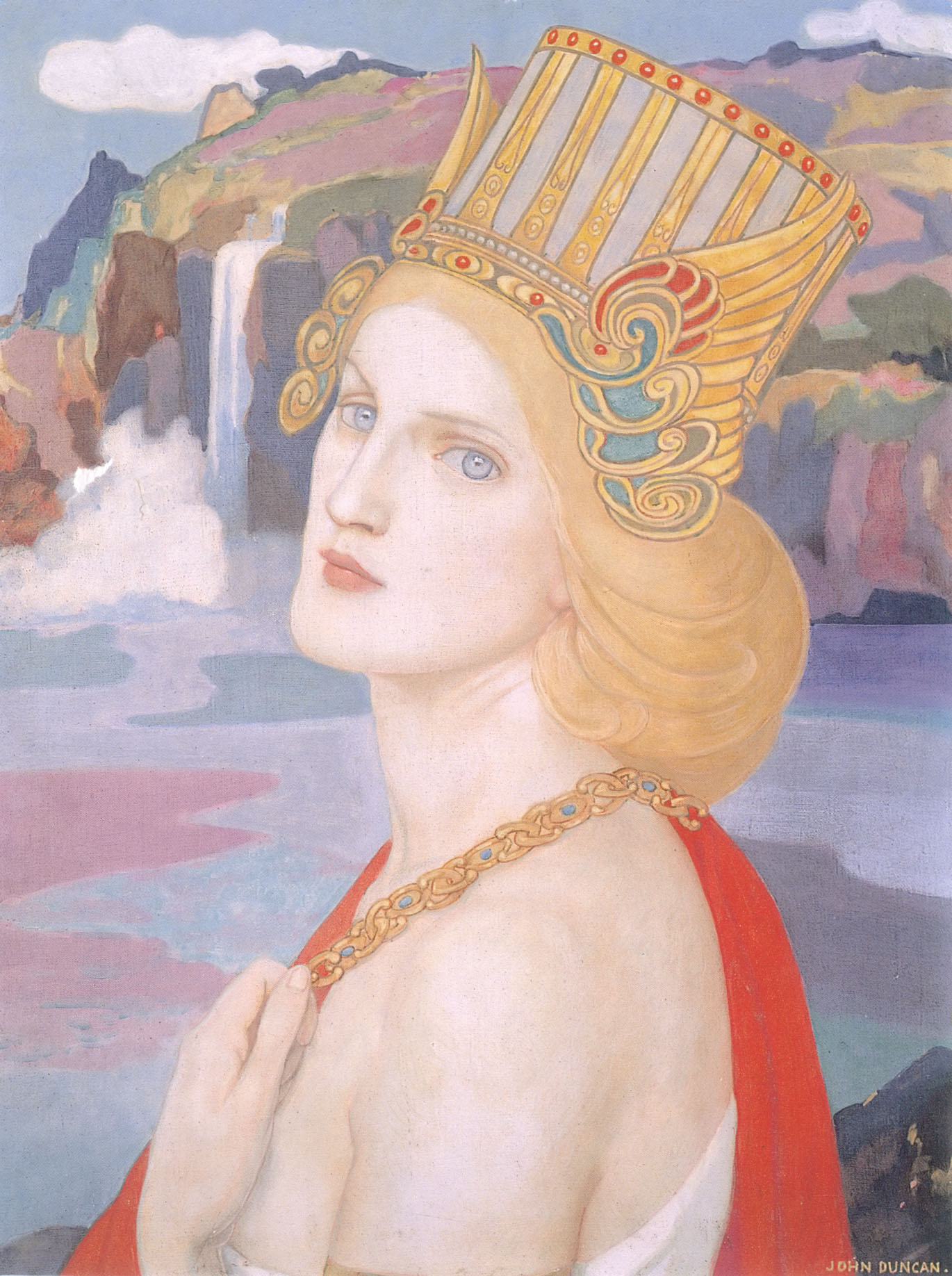
Aífe; by John Duncan

Aoife (/ˈiːfə/ EE-fə, Irish: [ˈiːfʲə]) is an Irish and Gaelic feminine given name. The name is derived from the Irish Gaelic aoibh, which means "beauty" or "radiance". It has been compared to the Gaulish name Esvios (Latinized Esuvius, feminine Esuvia), which may be related to the tribal name Esuvii and the theonym Esus.

== Irish mythology ==
In Irish mythology, Aífe the daughter of Airdgeimm, sister of Scathach, is a warrior woman beloved of Cuchullain in the Ulster Cycle. T. F. O'Rahilly supposed that the Irish heroine reflects an otherwise unknown goddess representing a feminine counterpart to Gaulish Esus.

Aífe or Aoife was also one of the wives of Lir in the Oidheadh chloinne Lir ("Fate of the Children of Lir"), who turned her stepchildren into swans. There is also Aoife (Áiffe ingen Dealbhaoíth), a woman transformed into a crane, whose skin after death became Manannán's "Crane-bag".

== Biblical rendering ==
The name is unrelated to the Biblical name Eva, which was rendered as Éabha in Irish, but due to the similarity in sound, Aoife has often been anglicised as Eva or Eve. Aoife MacMurrough (also known as Eva of Leinster) was a 12th-century Irish noblewoman.

== First officially recorded use in 20th-century Ireland ==
The first officially recorded use of "Aoife" as a given name in 20th-century Ireland was in 1912. However, during this period, despite many parts of Ireland speaking and writing in Irish, names and places in official records were typically recorded in English.

== Given name ==
=== People ===
- Aoife Ahern, Dean of Engineering at University College, Dublin
- Aoife Cusack (born 1996), Irish professional wrestler who performs under the ring name Lyra Valkyria
- Aoife Dooley (born 1991), Irish writer
- Aoife Hoey (born 1983), Irish bobsledding olympian
- Aoife Mannion (born 1995), Irish association footballer
- Aoife MacMurrough (c. 1145–1188), Irish Princess of Leinster and Countess of Pembroke
- Aoife McLysaght, Irish 21st century geneticist
- Aoife Melia, Irish medical doctor
- Aoife Moore, (fl. 2020s), sometimes Aoife-Grace Moore, Northern Irish journalist
- Aoife Mulholland (born 1978), Irish actress
- Aoife Ní Fhearraigh, Irish singer
- Aoife O'Donovan (born 1982), American singer
- Aoife O'Rourke (born 1997), Irish boxer
- Aoife Wafer, Irish International Rugby Union player
- Aoife Walsh (born 1989), Irish fashion model

=== Fictional characters ===
- Aoife, sister of Scathach in Michael Scott's series The Secrets of the Immortal Nicholas Flamel
- Main character in The Iron Thorn by Caitlin Kittredge
- Aife, a succubus in Lost Girl
- Aoife Brubeck, daughter of Holly Sykes, the protagonist of The Bone Clocks by David Mitchell
- Aoife Rabbitte, wife of Jimmy Rabbitte, in The Guts by Roddy Doyle
- Aoife Riordan, member of the Riordan family, in Instructions For A Heatwave by Maggie O'Farrell
- Aoife Molloy, female main character of the third and fourth book (Saving 6 and Redeeming 6) of The Boys of Tommen series by Chloe Walsh

== Other ==
- Aoife (album) (1996), the second album by the Irish singer Aoife
- The LÉ Aoife (P22) is a Republic of Ireland naval vessel

== See also ==
- List of Irish-language given names
