= Jack Hearne =

Jack Hearne may refer to:

- J. T. Hearne (1867–1944), English Test cricketer
- J. W. Hearne (1891–1965), English Test cricketer

See also:

- John Hearne (disambiguation)
