= Ahearn =

Ahearn or Ahearne is a surname. It descends from Echthighern mac Cennétig. Notable people with the surname include:

- Blake Ahearn (born 1984), American basketball player
- Bunny Ahearne (1900–1985), British ice hockey promoter
- Joe Ahearne (born 1962), British television director
- Michael Ahearne (born 1966), academic and author
- Mike Ahearn (1878–1948), American college football coach
- Rick Ahearn (1949–2023), American political consultant, longtime Ronald Reagan aide
- T. Franklin Ahearn (1886–1962), Canadian hockey club owner and politician
- Theresa Ahearn (1951–2000), Irish politician
- Thomas Ahearn (1855–1938), Canadian inventor and businessman
- Thomas Ahearn (Australian politician) (1929–2021) Australian politician and patent attorney
- William Ahearn (1858–1919), American baseball player

== See also ==
- Ahearne Cup
- Ahearn Field House
- Ahern
- Hearn (disambiguation)
- 3192 A'Hearn, a minor planet
