= Alloy (disambiguation) =

An alloy is a material composed of two or more metals or a metal and a nonmetal.

Alloy may also refer to:

== Entertainment ==
- Alloy (Skepticism album), 2008
- Alloy (Trillium album), 2011
- Alloy, the combined form of fictional DC Comics characters the Metal Men
- Alloy Digital, a digital media company folded into Defy Media
  - Alloy Entertainment, a print and television unit sold to Warner Bros. Television
- "Alloyed" (The Lord of the Rings: The Rings of Power), an episode of the first season of The Lord of the Rings: The Rings of Power

== Other uses ==
- Alloy (company), an American financial technology company
- Alloy (specification language), a declarative specification language
- Alloy wheel, wheels made from an alloy of aluminum or magnesium
- Alloy, West Virginia, an unincorporated community in the US

== See also ==
- Aloy, the main playable character of the RPG games Horizon Zero Dawn and Horizon Forbidden West
