= Hernu =

Hernu (French pronunciation: [ɛʁny]) is a French surname. Notable people with the surname include:

- Charles Hernu (1923–1990), French politician
- Laurent Hernu (born 1976), French decathlete

== See also ==
- Hern
