= Thomas Øverby =

Norwegian footballer (born 1976)

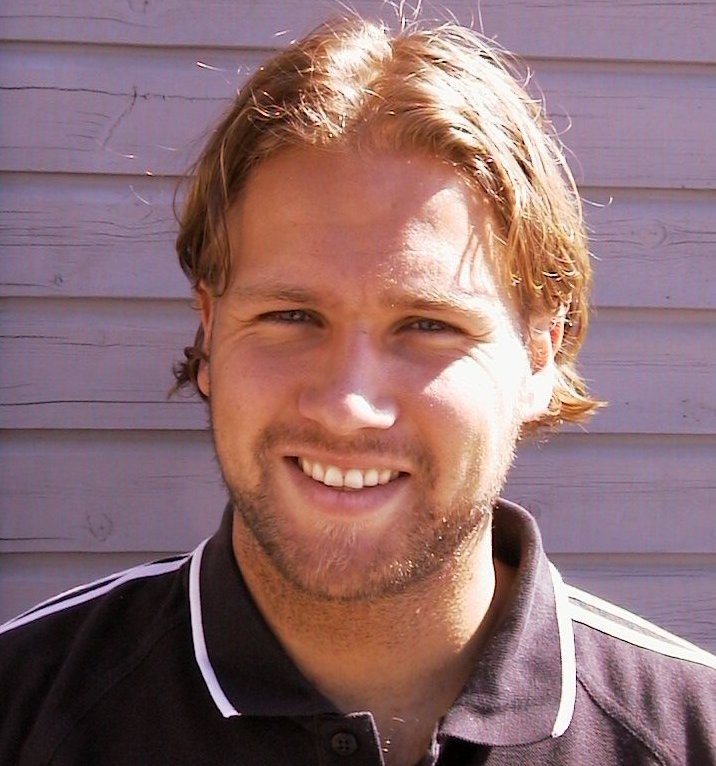
- Thomas Øverby

Personal information
- Date of birth: 28 April 1976 (age 50)
- Height: 1.82 m (6 ft 0 in)
- Position: Defender

Youth career
- Hernes
- Elverum

Senior career*
Years	Team	Apps	(Gls)
–1994	Elverum		
1995–1999	HamKam		
2000–2002	Skeid		
2002–2006	Hønefoss		
2007	HamKam		
2008–2009	Nybergsund		
- * Club domestic league appearances and goals

Thomas Øverby (born 28 April 1976) is a retired Norwegian football defender.

He hails from Hernes. Playing for Elverum, he was scouted by Hamkam ahead of the 1995 season. From 2000 to mid-2002 he played for Skeid, and from mid-2002 to 2006 for Hønefoss. Ahead of the 2007 season he returned to Hamkam, before finishing his career in Nybergsund.
