= Dale Baum =

American historian (born 1943)

- Born: 1943 (age 82–83); New Jersey, US
- Occupation: Historian

Academic background
- Education: Georgetown University (BA); University of Minnesota (MA, PhD)
- Thesis: The Political World of Massachusetts Radicalism: Voting Behavior and Ideology in the Civil War Party System, 1854-1872 (1978)
- Doctoral advisor: George D. Green; Kinley J. Brauer

Academic work
- Discipline: American Civil War, Reconstruction, political history, quantitative research
- Institutions: Texas A&M University

Dale Baum (born 1943) is an American historian and long time professor at Texas A&M University. He researches the political history of the American Civil War and Reconstruction era, Texas history, and quantitative research of historiography. Baum has authored three books, The Civil War Party System (1984), The Shattering of Texas Unionism (1998), and Counterfeit Justice (2009).

== Life ==
Baum was born in 1943 in New Jersey. He earned a B.A. in history with a minor in Government at Georgetown University in 1965. During the Vietnam War, Baum served active duty in the United States Coast Guard from 1967 to 1971 and was in the Coast Guard Reserve until honorably discharging in 1973. He completed a M.A. at University of Minnesota in 1972. During the summer of 1973, Baum studied in the Inter-university Consortium for Political and Social Research. He earned a Ph.D. in history with a minor in political science and sociology at University of Minnesota in 1978. While completing his graduate studies at University of Minnesota, Baum worked as a teaching and research assistant. His dissertation on voting behavior became the basis of his 1984 book. Baum's doctoral advisors were George D. Green and Kinley J. Brauer.

Baum's teaching topics include the political history of the American Civil War and Reconstruction era, Texas history, and quantitative research of historiography. He joined the faculty at Texas A&M University in 1978 as an assistant professor of history, later being promoted to associate professor in 1985 and full professor in 1999. Baum was a visiting Fulbright professor in the graduate school of international studies at Yonsei University in 2005. His book, Counterfeit Justice (2009), explores the life of Azeline Hearne, a Texas freedwoman during the Reconstruction era who faced multiple lawsuits after inheriting her former owner's estate.

Baum speaks Spanish and some Korean and French. He is well travelled and frequently lived abroad during his summers.

== Selected works ==
- Baum, Dale (1984). The Civil War Party System: The Case of Massachusetts, 1848-1876. University of North Carolina Press. ISBN 978-0-8078-1588-5.
- Baum, Dale (1998). The Shattering of Texas Unionism: Politics in the Lone Star State during the Civil War Era. Louisiana State University Press. ISBN 978-0-8071-2245-7.
- Baum, Dale (2009). Counterfeit Justice: The Judicial Odyssey of Texas Freedwoman Azeline Hearne. Louisiana State University Press. ISBN 978-0-8071-3405-4.
