= Cherne =

Cherne is a surname. Notable people with the surname include:

- Hal Cherne (1907–1983), American football player
- Leo Cherne (1912–1999), American economist, public servant, and commentator

== See also ==
- Herne (surname)
