= Esuvia gens =

Roman gens

The Esuvia gens was an ancient Roman family of the imperial period. The best known members of this gens are the Gallic emperor Tetricus, and his son and designated heir, Tetricus II.

== Origin ==
The nomen Esuvius is probably derived from the name of the Esuvii, a Gallic tribe that lived between the Liger and the Sequanus at the time of the Gallic Wars. A number of Esuvii lived in Roman Africa.

== Members ==
This list includes abbreviated praenomina. For an explanation of this practice, see filiation.

- Esuvius Modestus, made an offering to Vacuna at Reate in Sabinum, dating from the reign of Augustus.
- Titus Esuvius, restored a shrine to Jupiter Optimus Maximus and the spirits of the Antonine dynasty at Isca Augusta in Britain between AD 177 and 180.
- Esuvius Faustianus, a duplicarius, or soldier entitled to double pay, of the Legio III Augusta, named along with other duplicarii of the same legion in an inscription from Lambaesis in Numidia, dating from the Severan Dynasty.
- Gaius Pius Esuvius Tetricus, better known as Tetricus I, praeses of Gallia Aquitania, became ruler of the Gallic Empire from AD 271 to 274. He and his son, Tetricus II, capitulated to Aurelian, and were spared.
- Gaius C. f. Pius Esuvius Tetricus, better known as Tetricus II, the son of Tetricus I, was probably named Caesar, as his father's designated heir, around 273. The following year both submitted to Aurelian, and were spared.
- Esuvia Januaria, buried at Rome on the third day before the Kalends of April, (Note: March 30.) AD 348, in a tomb dedicated by Aradius Melissus, her husband of eighteen years, five months, and twenty-five days.

=== Undated Esuvii ===
- Esuvia Accintula, woman recorded in an inscription at Castra Lambaesitana in Numidia.
- Esuvius Aenulus, a boy buried in a family sepulchre at Setifis in Mauretania Caesariensis, aged five, along with a Mamilia, aged twenty-eight, Gavilia, her daughter, and another Esuvius.
- Esuvius Faustianus, a man of proconsular rank, named in an inscription from Theveste in Africa Proconsularis.
- Esuvius Felix, made an offering to Saturn at what is now Djebel Djelloud in Tunisia, formerly part of Africa Proconsularis.
- Esuvia Quintula, buried at Theveste, aged sixty, with a monument dedicated by her children.
- Esuvia Vic(toria?), buried in an uncertain part of Africa Proconsularis, aged seventy-five.

== See also ==
- List of ancient Roman gentes
- Aoife

== Bibliography ==
- Theodor Mommsen et alii, Corpus Inscriptionum Latinarum (The Body of Latin Inscriptions, abbreviated CIL), Berlin-Brandenburgische Akademie der Wissenschaften (1853–present).
- Bulletin Archéologique du Comité des Travaux Historiques et Scientifiques (Archaeological Bulletin of the Committee on Historic and Scientific Works, abbreviated BCTH), Imprimerie Nationale, Paris (1885–1973).
- René Cagnat et alii, L'Année épigraphique (The Year in Epigraphy, abbreviated AE), Presses Universitaires de France (1888–present).
- Inscriptiones Africae Latinae, Reimer (1942).
- Giacomo Devoto, Scritti minori, Le Monnier, Florence (1958).
- Heikki Solin, "Analecta Epigraphica CCLXXII–CCLXXXV", in Arctos: Acta Philologica Fennica, vol. XLVI, No. 46, pp. 193–237 (2012).
