= Edward Hearn =

Edward Hearn or Hearne may refer to:

- Ed Hearn (baseball) (born 1960), baseball catcher
- Eddie Hearn (born 1979), British sports promoter
- Edward Hearn (actor) (1888–1963), American actor, frequently credited as Edward or Ed Hearn
- Edward Hearn (rugby league), Australian rugby league footballer of the 1940s and 1950s
- Edward L. Hearn (1866–1945), Supreme Knight of the Knights of Columbus
- Ed Hearne (1887–1952), baseball shortstop
- Eddie Hearne (1887–1955), American racecar driver
