= Hern =

- Gender: Male

Origin
- Origin: English language
- Meaning: "mythical hunter"
- Region of origin: England

Other names
- Related names: Herne

Hern is an English masculine given name meaning "mythical hunter". There are variants including the English Herne ("mythical hunter God"), associated with Herne the Hunter. Hern is also common as a surname, including the British Isles variant "A'hern" and the Irish variant "O'Hern". Recorded alternative spellings include Harn, Hearns, Hearn, Hearne and Herne. Notable people with the name Hern include:

== Hern ==
- Dick Hern (1921–2002), British horse trainer
- Kevin Hern (born 1961), American businessman and politician from Oklahoma
- Riley Hern (1878–1929), Canadian ice hockey goaltender
- Tom Hern (born 1984), New Zealand actor
- Warren Hern (born 1938), American physician
- William Hern (1881–1954), American politician from Nebraska

== Variants ==
- Nicholas A'Hern (born 1969), Australian race walker
- Bertie Ahern (born 1951), Taoiseach of Ireland from 1997 to 2008
- Nick O'Hern (born 1971), Australian golfer

== See also ==
- Hearn (disambiguation)
- Hearne (surname)
- Herne (surname)
