= Cornelius Janson van Ceulen the Younger =

Dutch painter

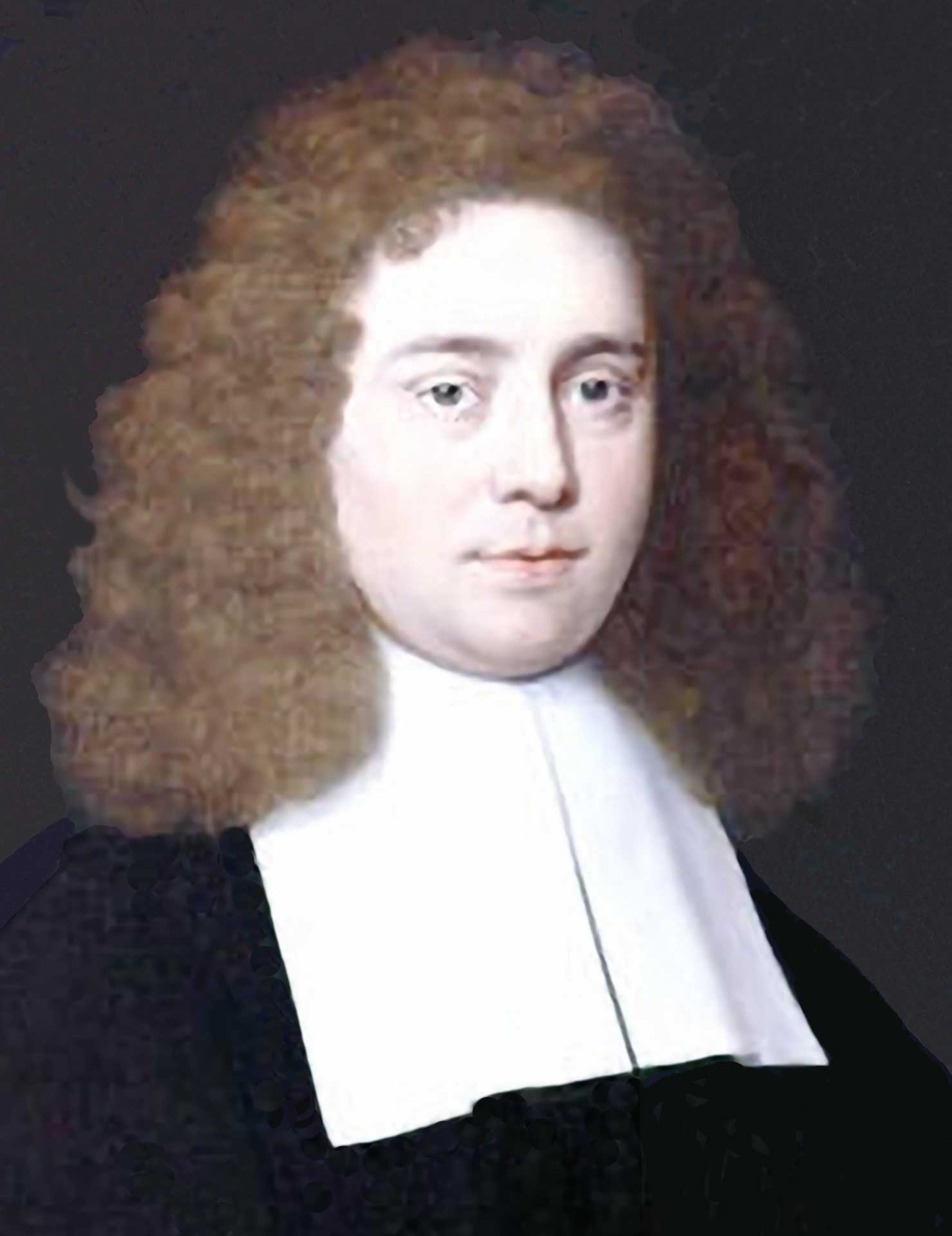
Portrait of the doctor Johannes Munnicks, ca. 1700

Cornelis Janssens van Ceulen the Younger (1634–1715), was an English painter active in the Dutch Republic.

He was born in London as the son of the Anglo-Dutch painter Cornelis Janssens van Ceulen and was baptised on 15 August 1634 at St Ann Blackfriars. He moved with his parents to Utrecht as a young boy in 1643. He presumably was trained there and it is where he married in 1668. Though he is documented in England during the years 1675–1678, he seems to have spent most of his life in Utrecht, where he later died.
