= Cornelius Johnson (artist) =

English painter (1593–1661)

Cornelis Janssens van Ceulen (Jonson)
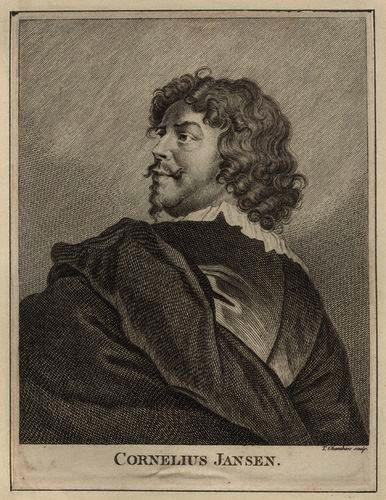
- Born: before 14 October 1593; London, England
- Died: 5 August 1661 (aged 67); Utrecht, Dutch Republic
- Known for: Portraiture
- Spouse: Elizabeth Beke

Cornelis Janssens (born Cornelis Janssens van Ceulen, (Note: Also Cornelius Jonson van Ceulen, Cornelis Jansz. van Ceulen and many other variants.) Dutch: [kɔrˈneːlɪ ˈɕɑnsəns fɑŋ ˈkøːlə(n)]; (Note: In isolation, Cornelis, Janssens and van are pronounced [kɔrˈneːlɪs], [ˈjɑnsəns] and [vɑn], respectively.) bapt. 14 October 1593 – bur. 5 August 1661) was an Anglo-Dutch painter of portraits. Born of Dutch or Flemish parents who fled to London from Antwerp to escape religious persecution, Cornelis Janssens van Ceulen probably trained in the northern Netherlands. Around 1618 he established himself as a portrait painter in London. His signed or monogrammed portraits number several hundred; he is the first English-born painter known to have made so many. He was active in England, from at least 1618 to 1643, when he moved to Middelburg in the Netherlands to escape the English Civil War. Between 1646 and 1652 he lived in Amsterdam, before settling in Utrecht, where he died.

Janssens painted many portraits of emerging new English gentry. His early portraits were panel paintings with "fictive" oval frames. His works can be found in major collections in the UK and overseas as well as in private collections in stately homes in Britain.

He was an accomplished portrait painter, but lacked the flair of a master such as Anthony van Dyck. His style varied considerably over his career, and he was able to assimilate new influences into his own style without any discordant effect. He was particularly accurate and detailed in his depiction of clothing. He was one of the few artists in England at this time who consistently signed and dated their work.

== Family life ==
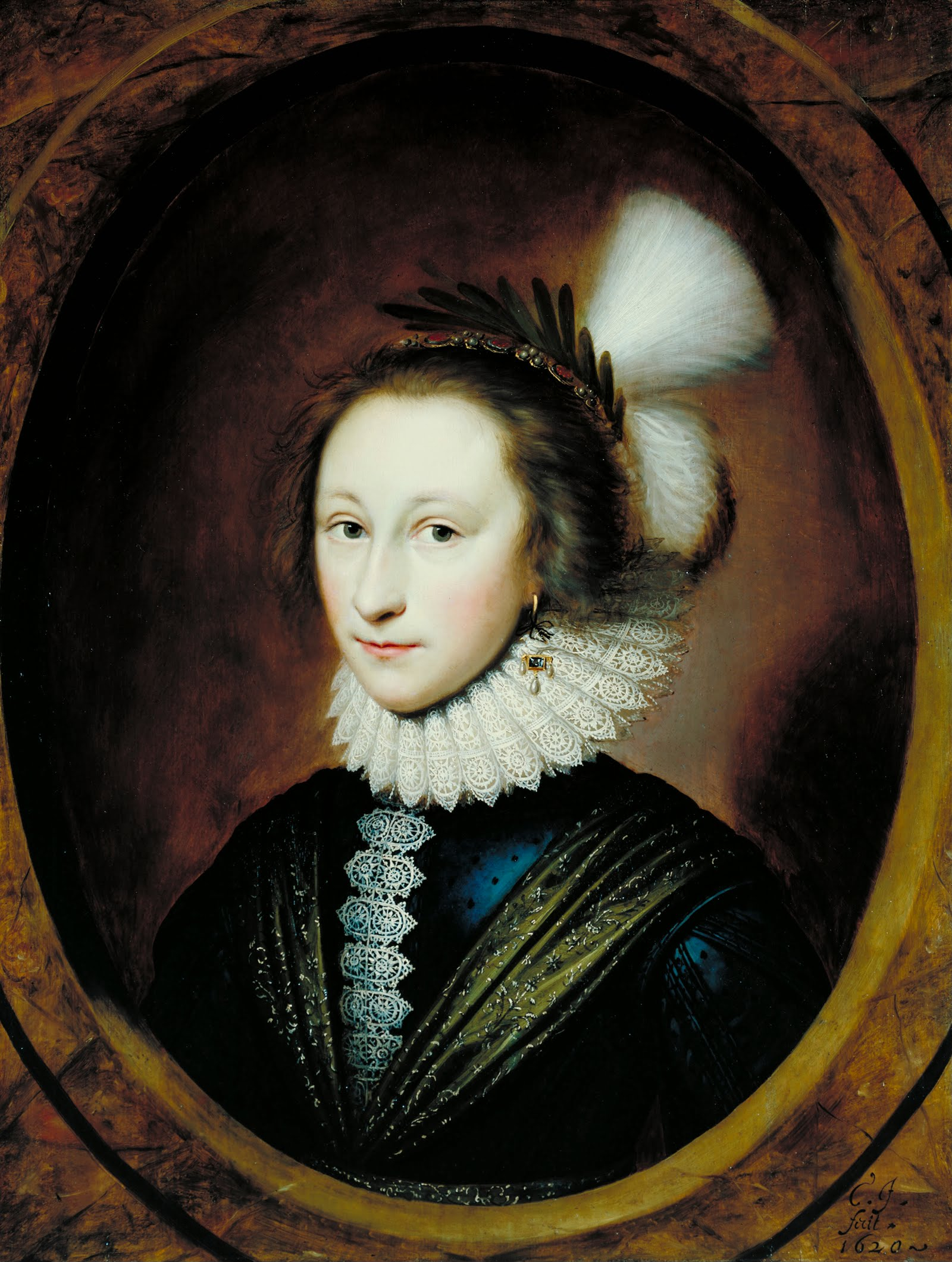
Portrait of Susanna Temple, later Lady Lister (1620) – Google Art Project. This is one of a number of portraits of the Temple family painted by Johnson

Janssens was born to Dutch or Flemish parents in London – his father had been a religious refugee from Antwerp, and his paternal grandfather had come from Cologne. He was baptised at the Dutch Church at Austin Friars much used by the Netherlandish community in London. He was the son of Johanna le Grand and Cornelis Janssens. He may have been trained in the Netherlands, possibly under Michiel Jansz. van Mierevelt. He was certainly influenced by other artists from the Netherlands, and his early works follow the design and mood of Dutch painters.

He had returned to England by 1618 when he was a witness at the baptism of his nephew, Theodore Russell – Johnson' sister was married to Nicholas Russell of Bruges. He was active in England, from then until 1643. In the 1620s, he lived and had his studio in Blackfriars, London, as did Anthony van Dyck and Peter Oliver; it was within the boundaries of the City of London, but was a liberty and so avoided the monopoly in the City of members of the London painters' Guild. He married Elizabeth Beke of Colchester on 16 July 1622 at the Dutch church in London. Their son James (who presumably died young) was baptised on 30 September 1623 at St Anne's Church. Another son Cornelis Janssens, junior who also became a painter, was baptised on 15 August 1634.

Janssens wished to be regarded as an English gentleman, registering his pedigree with the College of Arms. His arms were three gold parrots on a gold background, and had a crest of a silver Catherine wheel with two parrot wings behind it. Apparently winged crests are common in German heraldry which may show the arms previously used by the family.

Janssens moved to Canterbury in the mid-1630s, living with Sir Arnold Braems, a Flemish merchant, and continued to live in England until after the outbreak of the English Civil War, but in October 1643, apparently at the insistence of his wife, he moved to Middelburg, joining the Guild of Saint Luke there. He was given parliamentary permission to travel " ... and to cary with him such pictures and colours, bedding, household stuff, pewter, and brass as belongs to himself". Between 1646 and 1652 he lived in Amsterdam, before settling in Utrecht, where he was buried.

== Portraiture ==
Janssens' first dated work is from 1617, and may be of a Dutch subject; 1619 marks the beginning of his English portraits, which were initially heads only, although he later painted full-length and group portraits.

For painting a portrait, Janssens liked to charge £5 compared with a more typical figure of 10s – 20s. However, this was not as expensive as better known artists such as van Dyck or Peter Lely. Karen Hearn's ODNB entry for Janssens notes that "in 1638 Sir Thomas Pelham of Halland House, Sussex, paid £4 for his portrait by Janssens" (referencing an account book among the Pelham family papers, BL, Add. MS 33145, fol. 107).

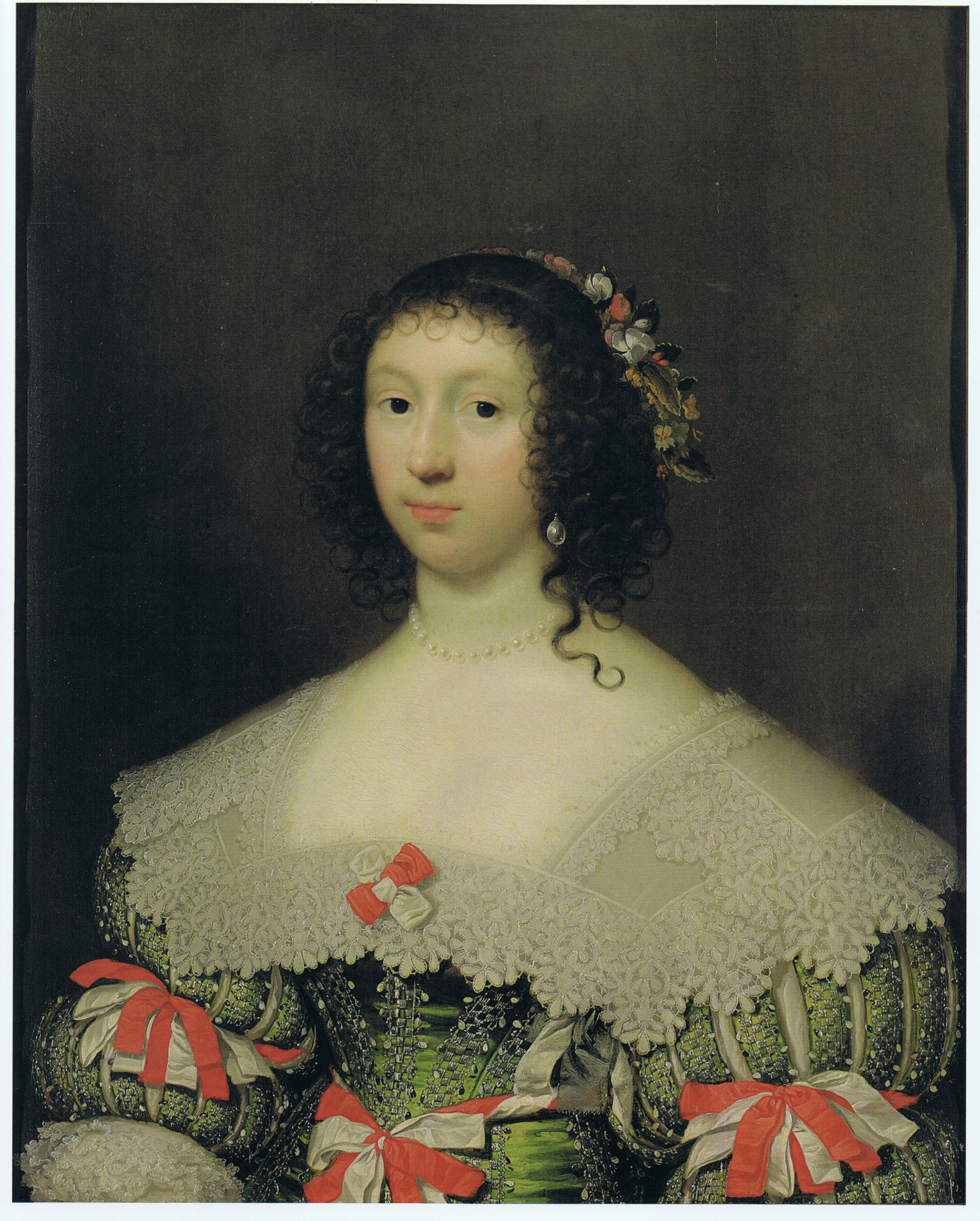
Elizabeth Campion (1614–1673), 1631.

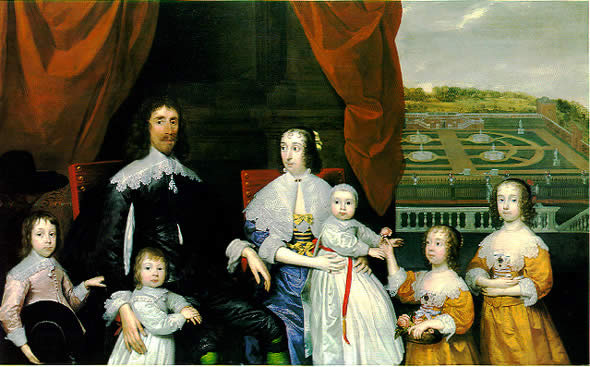
Baron Capel and his Family, 1641. Capel was a leading Royalist, executed in 1649.

There are hundreds of portraits of the emerging new gentry by Janssens, including Lady Rose MacDonnell of Antrim. "Janssens’ art was best suited to the relative intimacy of the bust length portrait in which, with a certain detachment, he captured the reticence of the English landed gentry and minor aristocracy". One of his earliest surviving portraits is of Susanna Temple, grandmother of Sarah, Duchess of Marlborough (Tate). This portrait was subsequently engraved by Robert White towards the end of the seventeenth century. A copy of the engraving was among the prints owned by Samuel Pepys which subsequently passed to Magdalene College, Cambridge.

His royal portraits include Charles I as well as Charles II and James II, painted as children, both of which are in the National Portrait Gallery, London. He collaborated with Gerard Houckgeest on a portrait of Charles I's wife, Queen Henrietta Maria.

After his move to the Netherlands, he continued to produce portraits of English clients – both exiled Royalists, and clients still living in England.

== Studio ==
Janssens’ studio in the 1620s was in St Anne's, Blackfriars, London. The size of Janssens’ studio is not known, but surviving portraits such as the portrait erroneously inscribed Countess of Arundel and that of Sir Alexander Temple (both below) help reconstruct the painting process. It is likely that Janssens did not paint the complete portraits himself. The wet-over-dry paint layering of the costumes (see 'Technique' below) and the fictive ovals allowed contributions from others in the studio, as did the demand for additional versions.

== Patronage ==
His patrons came from the gentry, but were not from the highest levels in society. His sitters were Dutch immigrants, gentlemen and courtiers. During the first few years of his career, a network of patronage by five families enabled Janssens to establish his reputation as a painter on the national stage. These families were the Boothby family of London and Chingford, the Corbett family of Shropshire, the Leveson family of Shropshire and Staffordshire, the Temple family of Burton Dassett and Stowe, and the Lenthall family of Burford and Besselsleigh. These families were connected to each other by marriage.

The identity of many of his sitters has been lost. Despite having only received a few commissions from the crown, in 1632, Janssens was appointed as "his Majesty's servant in the quality of Picture drawer" by Charles I. This appointment was perhaps in connection with the arrival of van Dyck and the departure from England of Daniel Mytens – Janssens may have been found a role as a back-up for van Dyck.

== Style ==
He has been described as "one of the most gifted and prolific portrait painters practising in England during the 1620s and 1630s". Lionel Cust describes him as being "more accomplished" than Gheeraerts. However, he has also been described as "a good painter, but unable to compete with the flair and superlative skills of van Dyck". Compared with van Dyck, Janssens’ portraits were "lower key but exquisite".

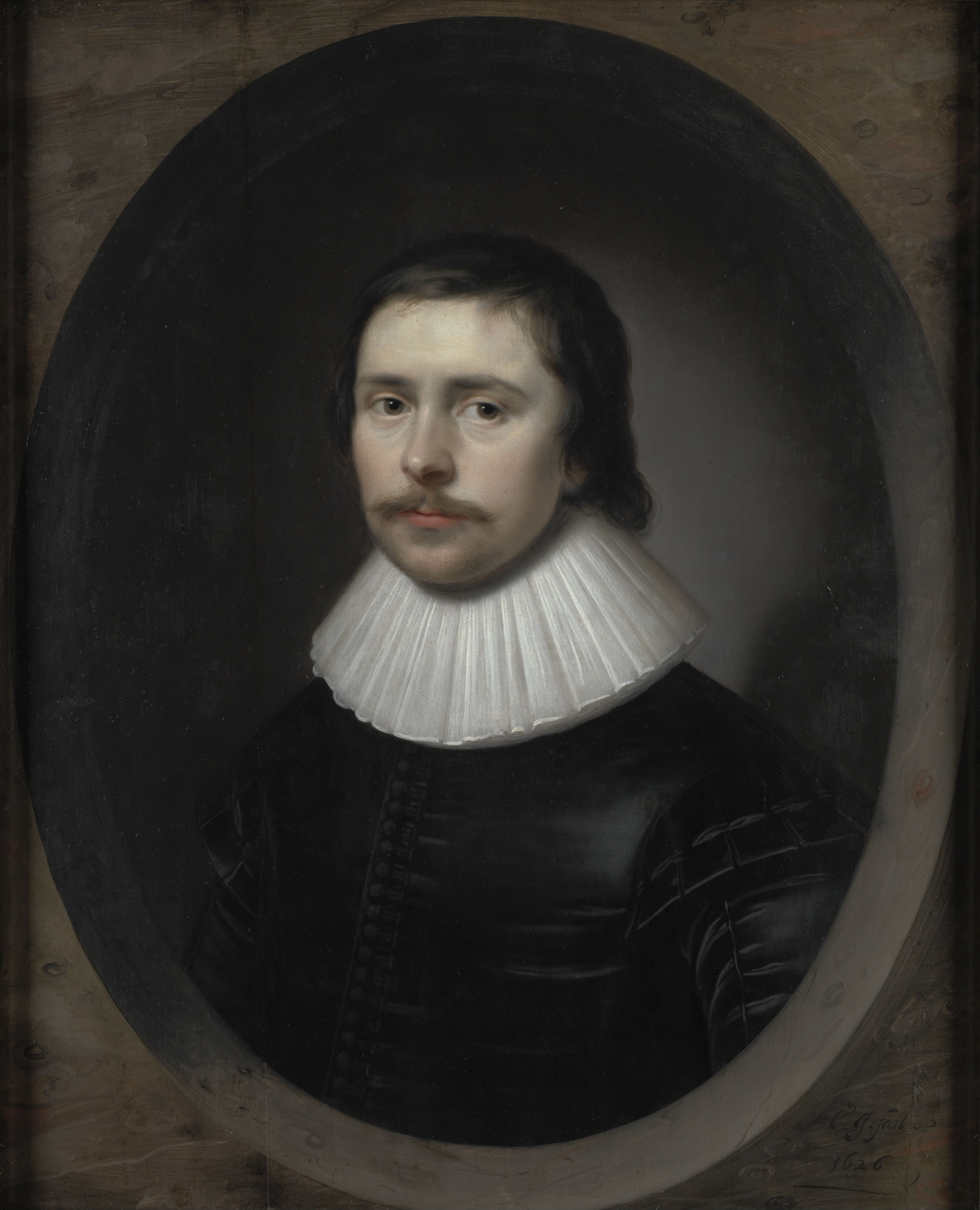
A typical early work of 1626, Edward Hyde, 1st Earl of Clarendon, also later a prominent Royalist.

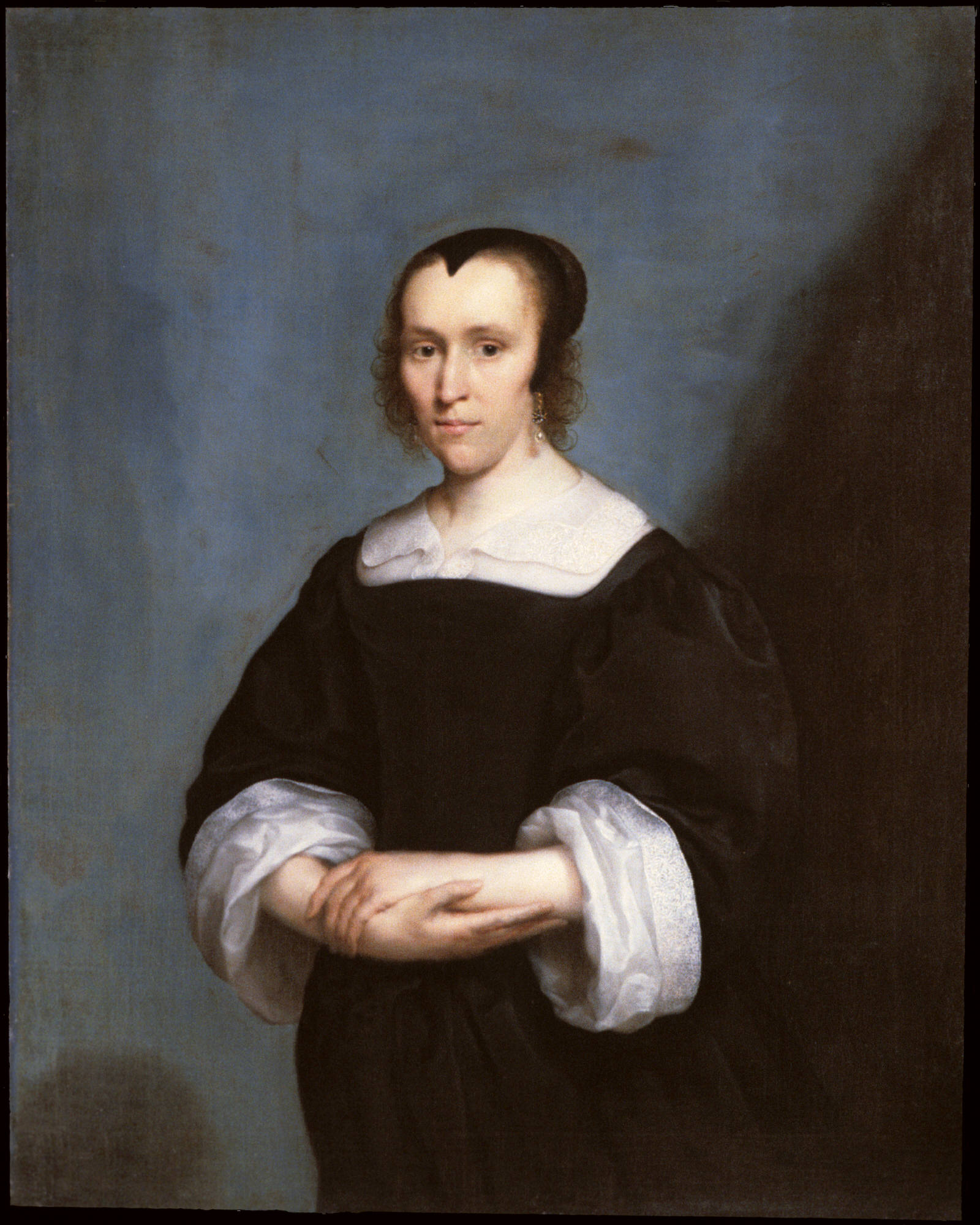
Portrait of a Woman, 1655-56, Princeton University Art Museum

He was one of the few artists in England at this time who consistently signed and dated their work, except for his later full-lengths, which his clients may have hoped would be mistaken for more expensive van Dycks. He may have been successful in this, as some full-length portraits attributed to van Dyck's workshop may well be by him. In the early years, his standard way of signing portraits was the phrase "fecit C J", although the 1619 portrait entitled the Countess of Arundel (below) is signed Cornelius Johnson fecit and many later works also have a full signature.

Janssens’ early portraits were panel paintings with "fictive" oval frames – they appear to have a wooden or marble oval surround, but this is actually painted on to the panel. This trompe-l'œil effect was one of Janssens' favourite devices in the early part of his career. "His figures are usually placed in front of dark, undefined backgrounds with focus on their faces and elaborate costumes that denote their social standing." He also painted some portrait miniatures on copper.

His early works (for example the 1620 portrait of Sir Alexander Temple) were described by C. H. Collins Baker as "flat wooden and inanimate". Within a year, he has made "an astonishing advance" and his modelling becomes full and "his temper established". His earliest three-quarter length work is a pair of portraits of Thomas Boothby and his wife painted in 1619 and sold by the Weiss Gallery in 1988. Another three-quarter length portrait (of Lord Keeper Coventry) is dated 1623, and shows a certain lack of skill in dealing with the body, which is overcome in later works.

In his portraits, the sitters head is often unexpectedly low. The eyes have enlarged, rounded irises and deep curved upper lids.

The London Painters and Stainers company has a 1623/4 portrait of Clement Pargeter, William Peacock and Thomas Babb that may be by Janssens. If so, it is the earliest group portrait by him.

His style was conservative although it varied considerably over his career, and he was able to assimilate new influences into his own style without any discordant effect. He took from, in turn, Mytens, van Dyck, and William Dobson. His last Dutch portraits show a different style reflecting contemporary portraiture there. However he also influenced other artists – both lesser lights as well as more accomplished artists such as van Dyck. Following the Netherlandish tradition, he was particularly accurate and detailed in depiction of clothing. As a result, his portraits are especially useful to costume historians.

== Technique ==
Janssens uses a number of techniques that taken together uniquely identify his studio during his early career. These include the presence of both wet-in-wet and discreet layering; calculated variations in brushwork and the use of high quality (and expensive) pigments that survived aging well.

He "was masterful in bringing the unique characteristics of his pigments to the most dazzling effect. Janssens’ use of azurite blue is a primary example of how he utilized the character of each pigment to yield distinctive textures and eye-catching details."

Janssens was consulted by Théodore de Mayerne on handling orpiment (a poisonous yellow pigment) and painted his portrait. In addition to describing his usage of orpiment to de Mayerne, Janssens also told Daniel King his technique for draperies. For linen draperies he used "white and oker broken with bone black". For blue draperies, he first laid in "all the background folds and shadows ... neatly and perfectly finished" with "indico ground in drying oiland mixt w[i]th smalt and white". When this had dried, he painted over it a glaze of ultramarine and "fair white".

== Exhibitions, sales and ownership of his work in important collections ==
From the second half of the seventeenth century onwards, there were frequent art auctions in London and later in provincial cities. Johnson's work was regularly sold at these auctions – for example lot 150 at a sale of paintings at Exeter Exchange in the Strand, 3 April 1690.

Karen Hearn, Honorary Professor at University College London, curated a display of Johnson's work which was held at the National Portrait Gallery, London from April to September 2015. In July, 2016, the first large scale exhibition devoted solely to his work was held at the Weiss Gallery in London.

His work can be found in the National Gallery, the Tate Gallery, the National Portrait Gallery, Royal Collection, the Scottish National Portrait Gallery, the Dulwich Picture Gallery, many UK provincial galleries and in private collections in stately homes in Britain. Outside the UK, his work can be found in the Huntington Library Art Collections and Botanical Gardens, the Museum Catharijneconvent in Utrecht, the Yale Center for British Art. and Leufsta Manor, Sweden. His Portrait of a Lady was part of the exhibition of Tudor and Stuart Fashion at the Queen's Gallery.

Johnson's name is attached to the Johnson portrait of William Shakespeare in the Folger Shakespeare Library. This was painted around 1610 and has a long association with Shakespeare. It was altered to show a higher forehead. It is no longer believed to be by Johnson.

== Name ==
The large number of variants of his name has led to some controversy over the correct form. Johnson himself must take some responsibility for this since he frequently changed his signature. Hearn has argued that in his later years in the Netherlands, he added the words "van Ceulen" ("from Cologne") to his signature as a marketing technique to emphasize his foreign origins. He had previously added "Londines" (London) to his signature, but stopped using this form following the outbreak of the First Anglo-Dutch War in 1652.

Finberg says "I think I may take this opportunity to protest once again against the prevalent habit of calling this artist Janssens. In spite of Walpole's unfortunate remark that this is the correct form of the name, there is no excuse for using it. While in England the artist invariably spelt his name Cornelius Johnson, and when he left England he changed the form to Jonson. The usual form of his signature when the name is given in full is invariably, in all the pictures painted after 1643 which I have seen : ' Cornelius Jonson van Ceulen.' He appears never to have adopted the form of Janson, Jansen, or Janssens. But so long as auctioneers are born with an ingrained conviction that a foreign-looking name gives greater value to a picture than an English name, so long may we expect to find Cornelius Johnson or Jonson masquerading in catalogues as Cornelius Janssens."

== Some portraits ==
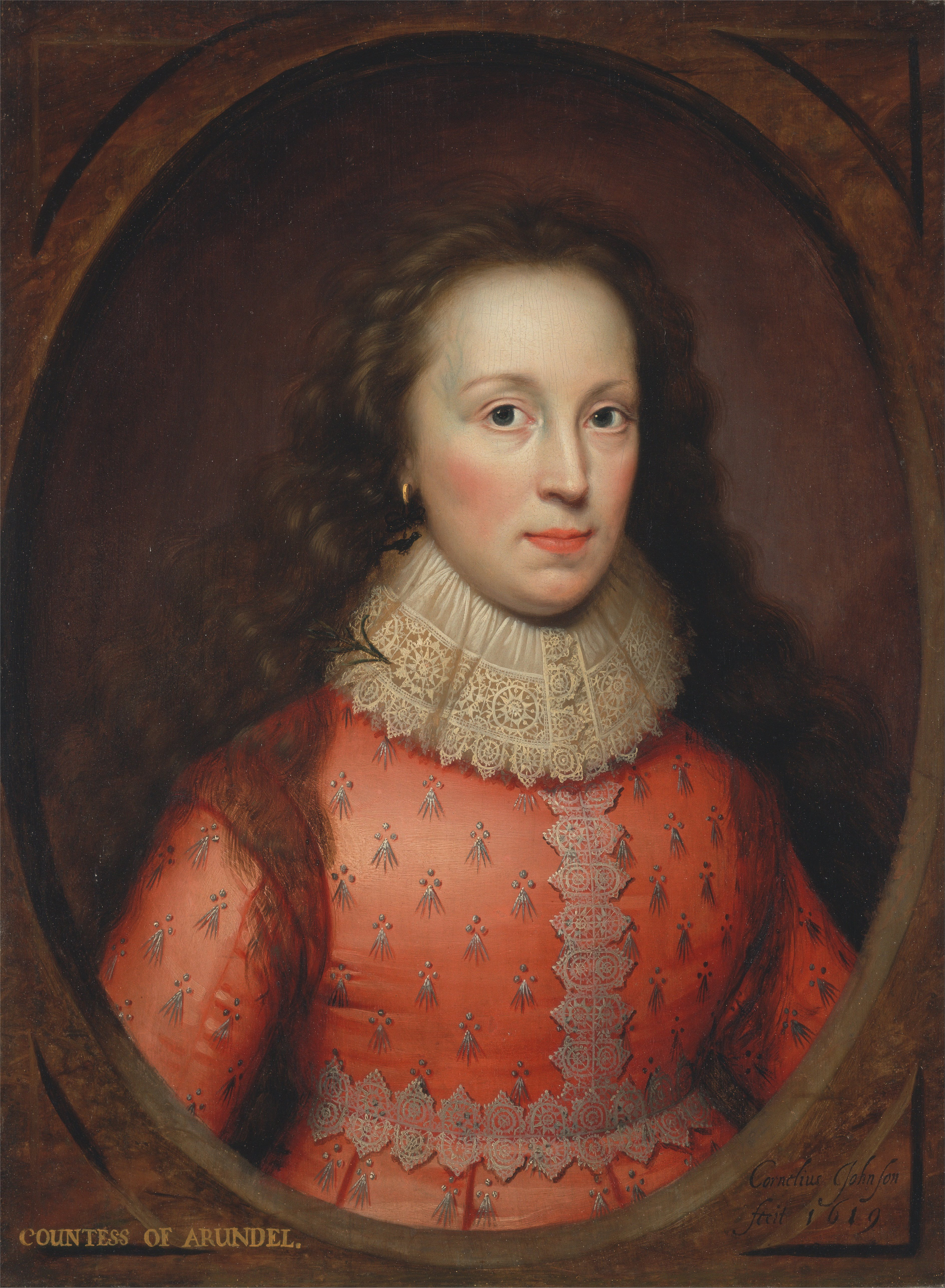
Inscribed Countess of Arundel by Cornelius Johnson, 1619 at the Yale Center for British Art

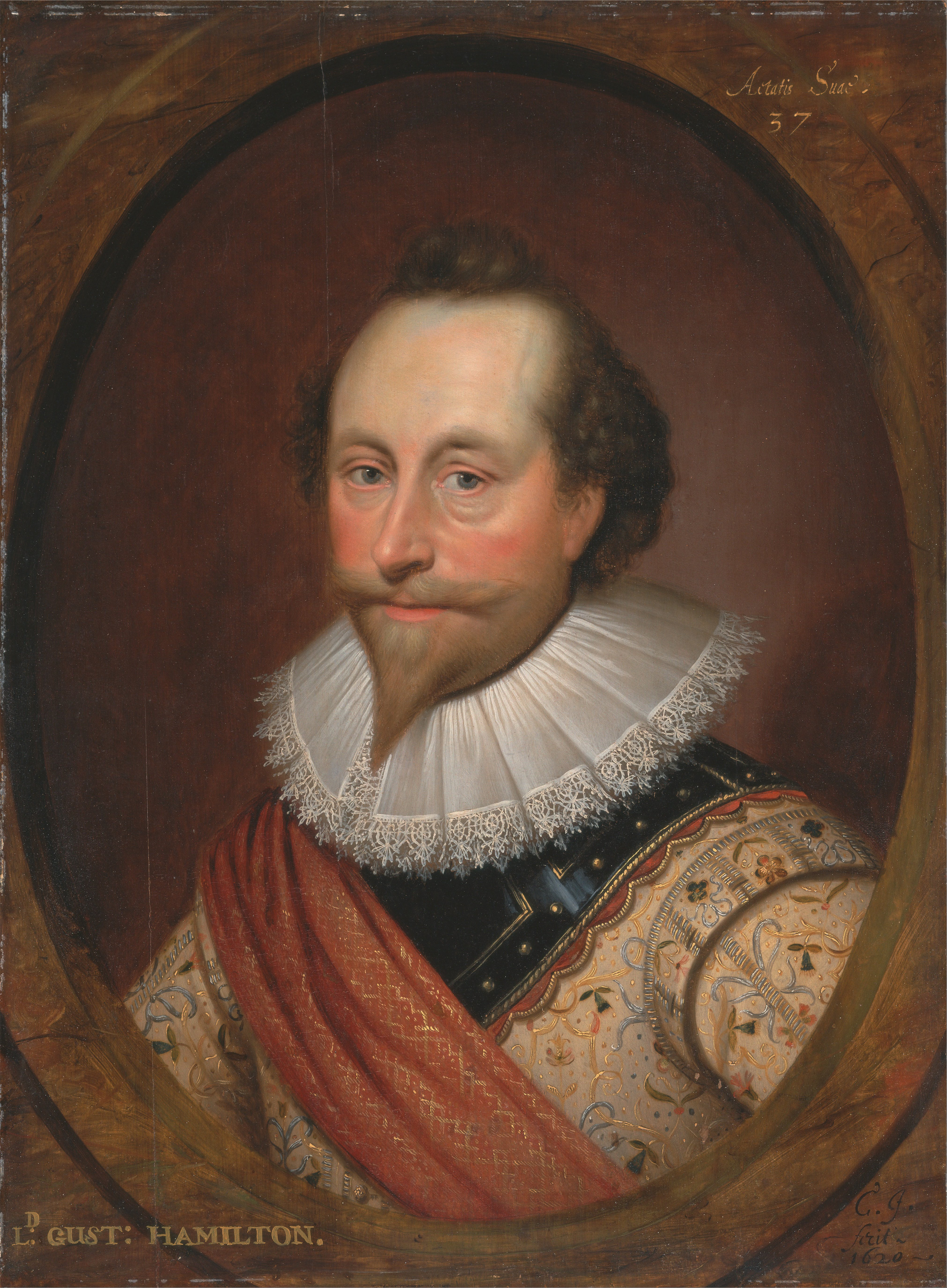
Erroneously inscribed Ld Gust Hamilton, but known to be Sir Alexander Temple, 1620 at the Yale Center for British Art

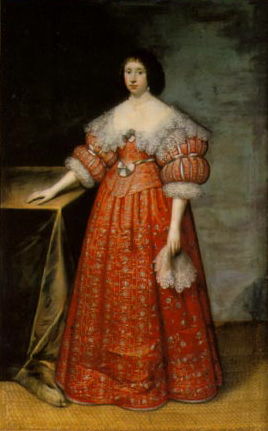
Unknown Woman (Elena Lee, Lady Sussex), 1630

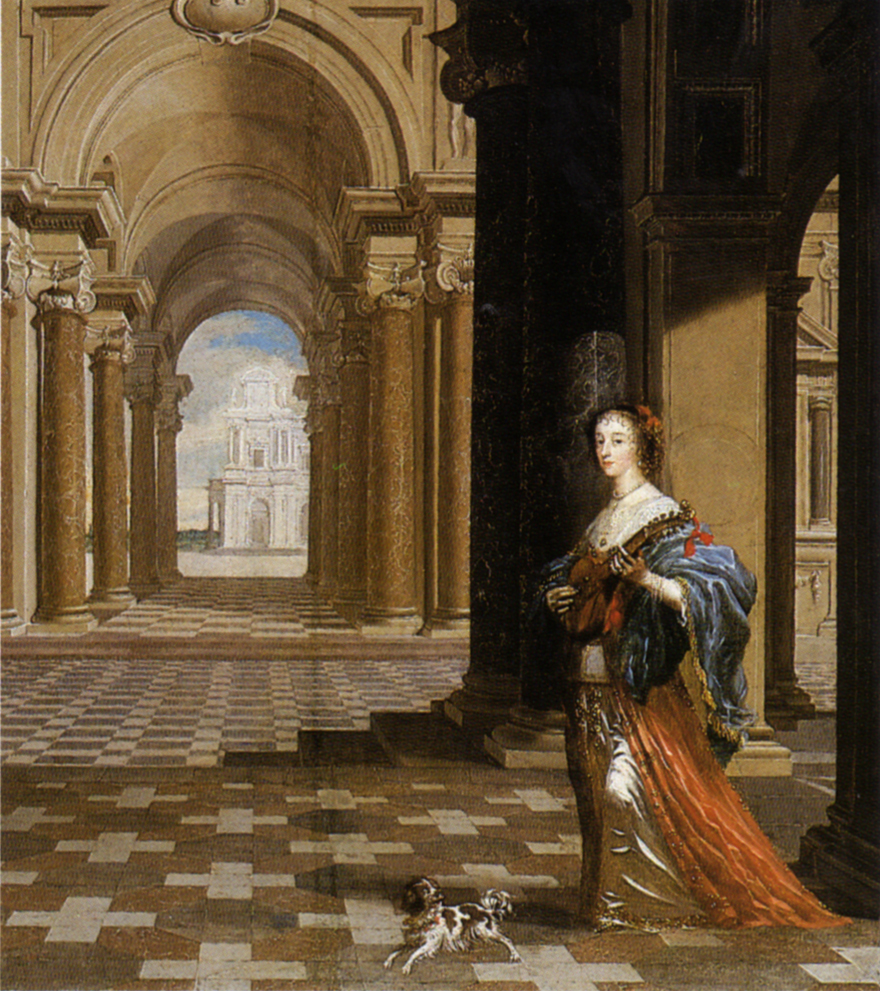
Queen Henrietta Maria (before 1639)

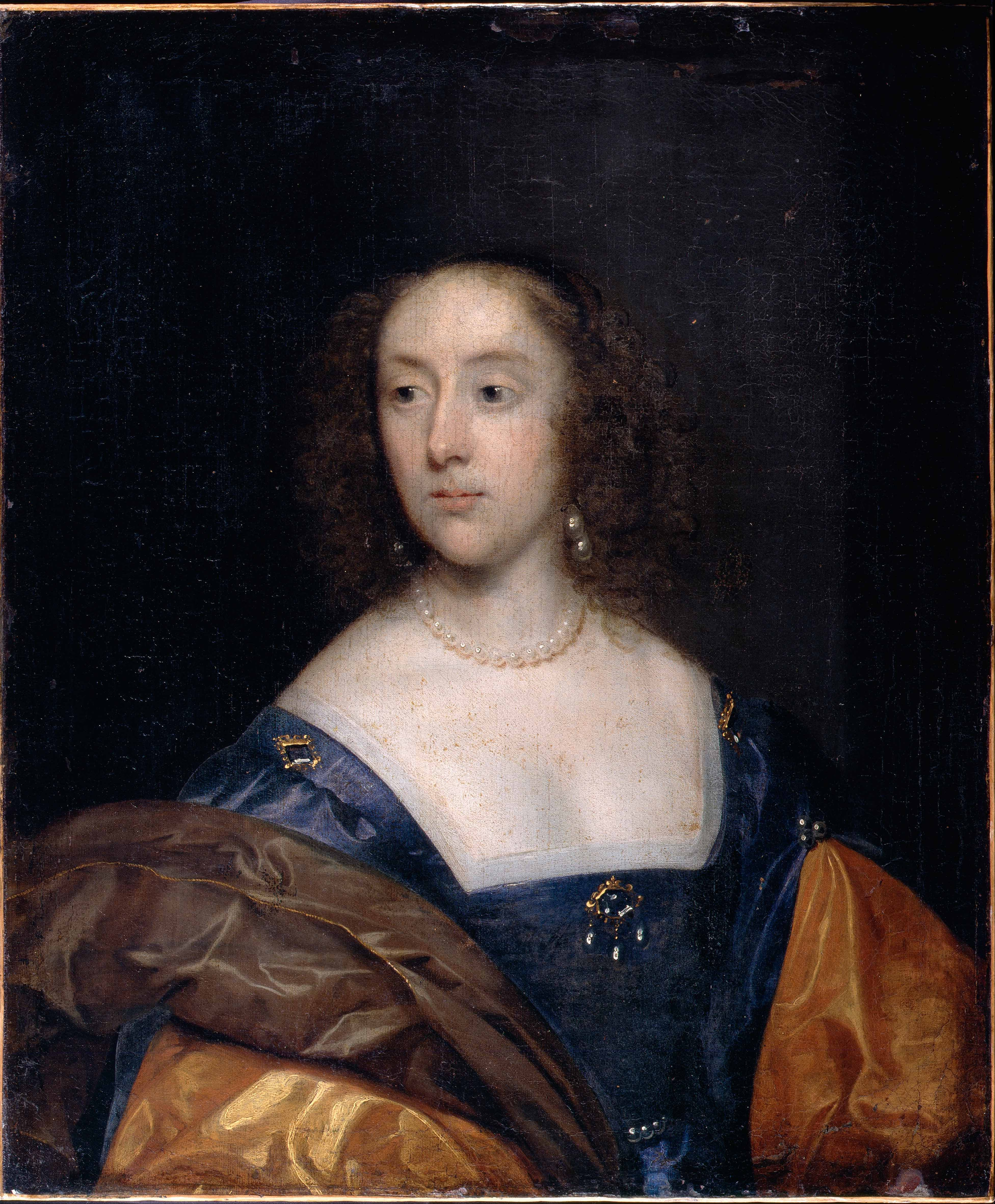
Portrait of a Lady in Blue, c. 1639

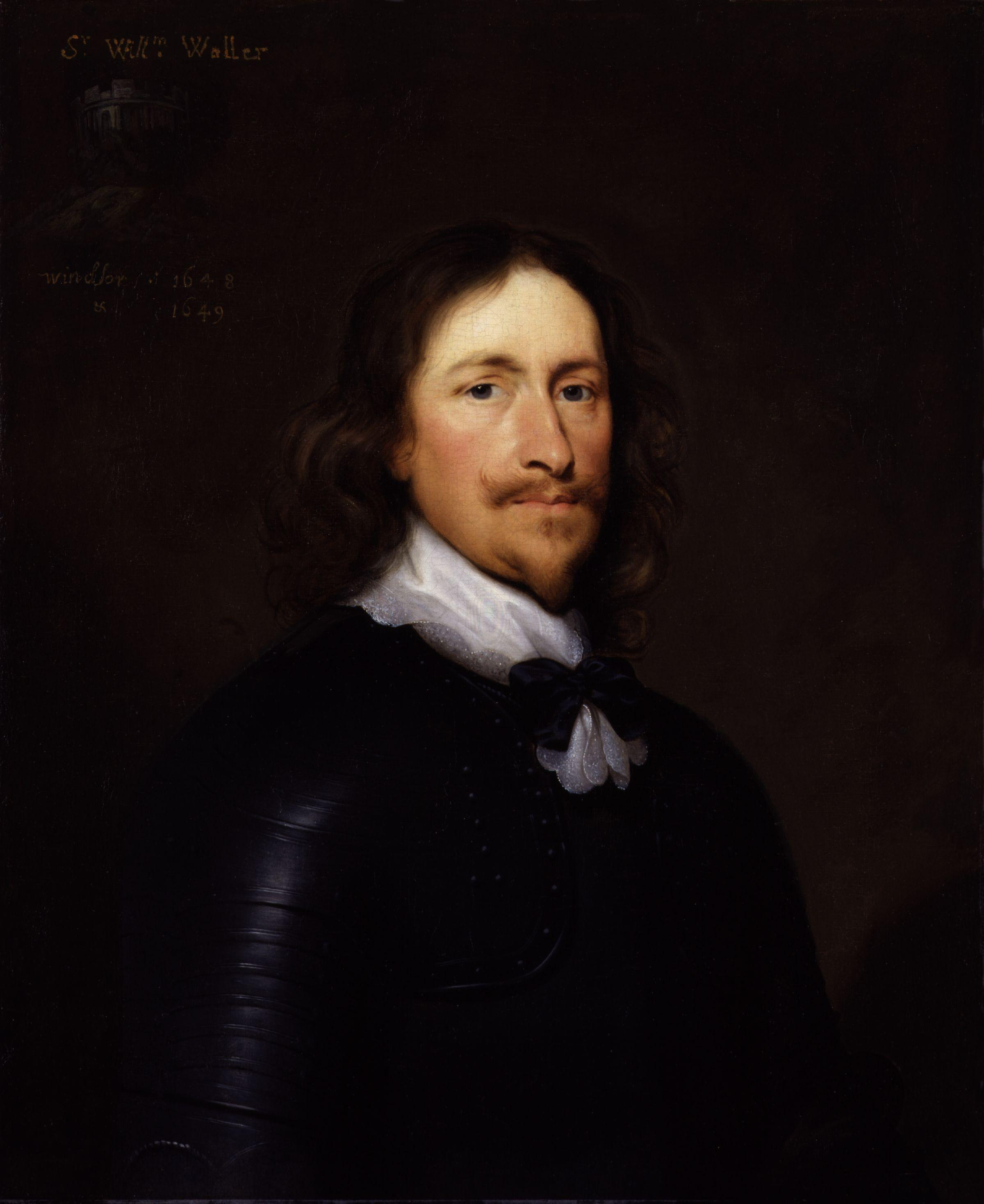
Sir William Waller, 1643

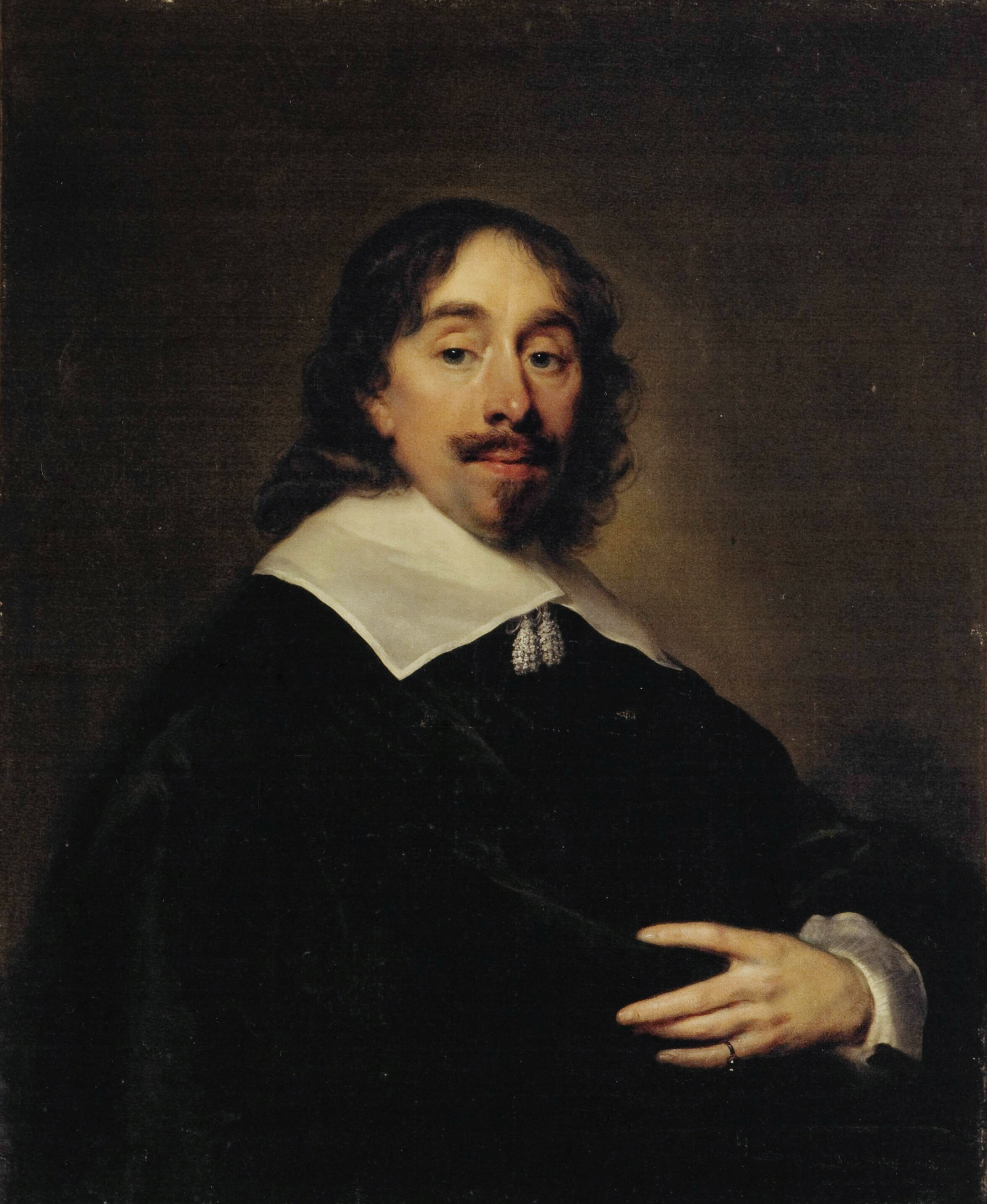
Thomas Cletcher, jeweller and mayor of The Hague, 1643

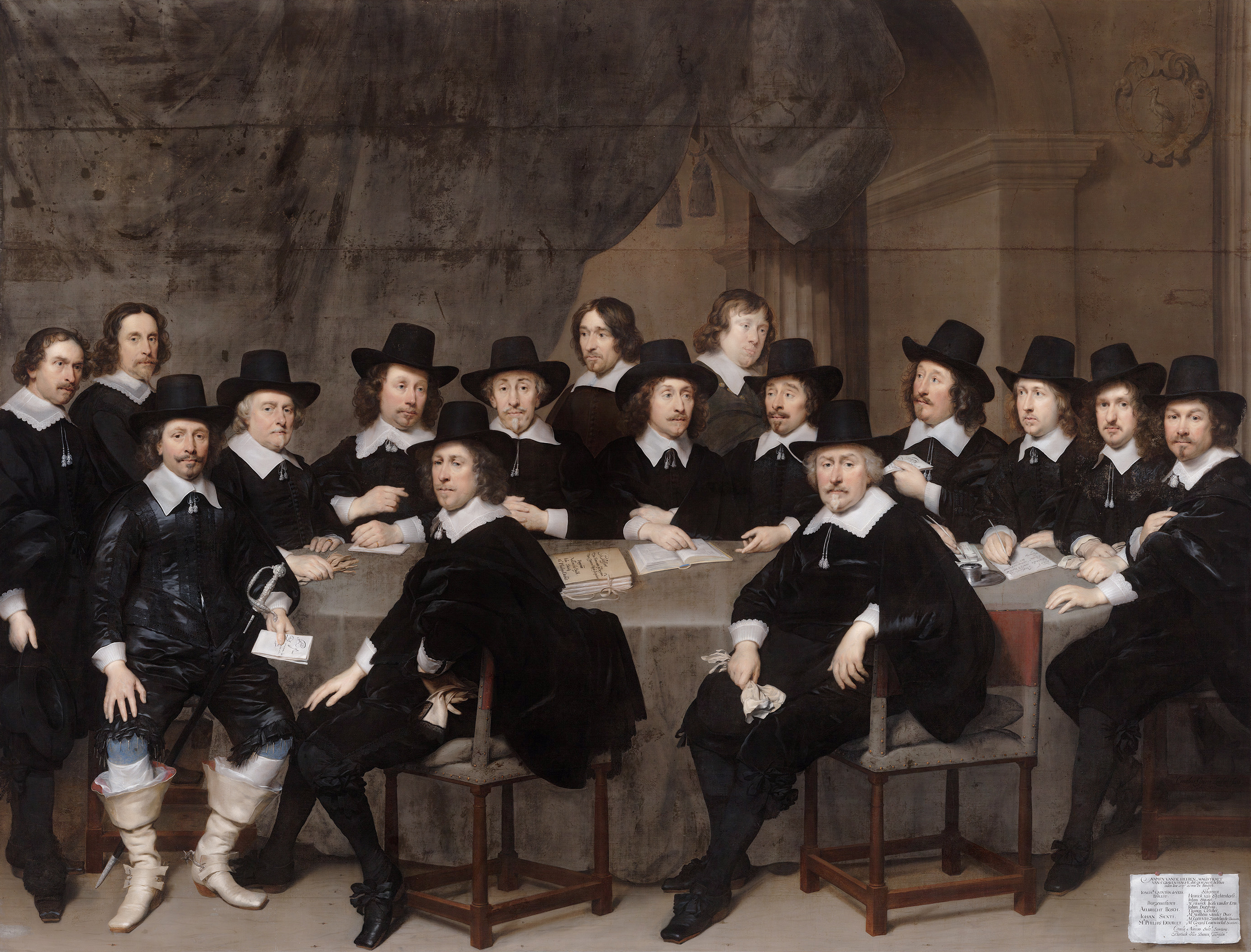
The Hague Magistrates, 1647, at the Old City Hall

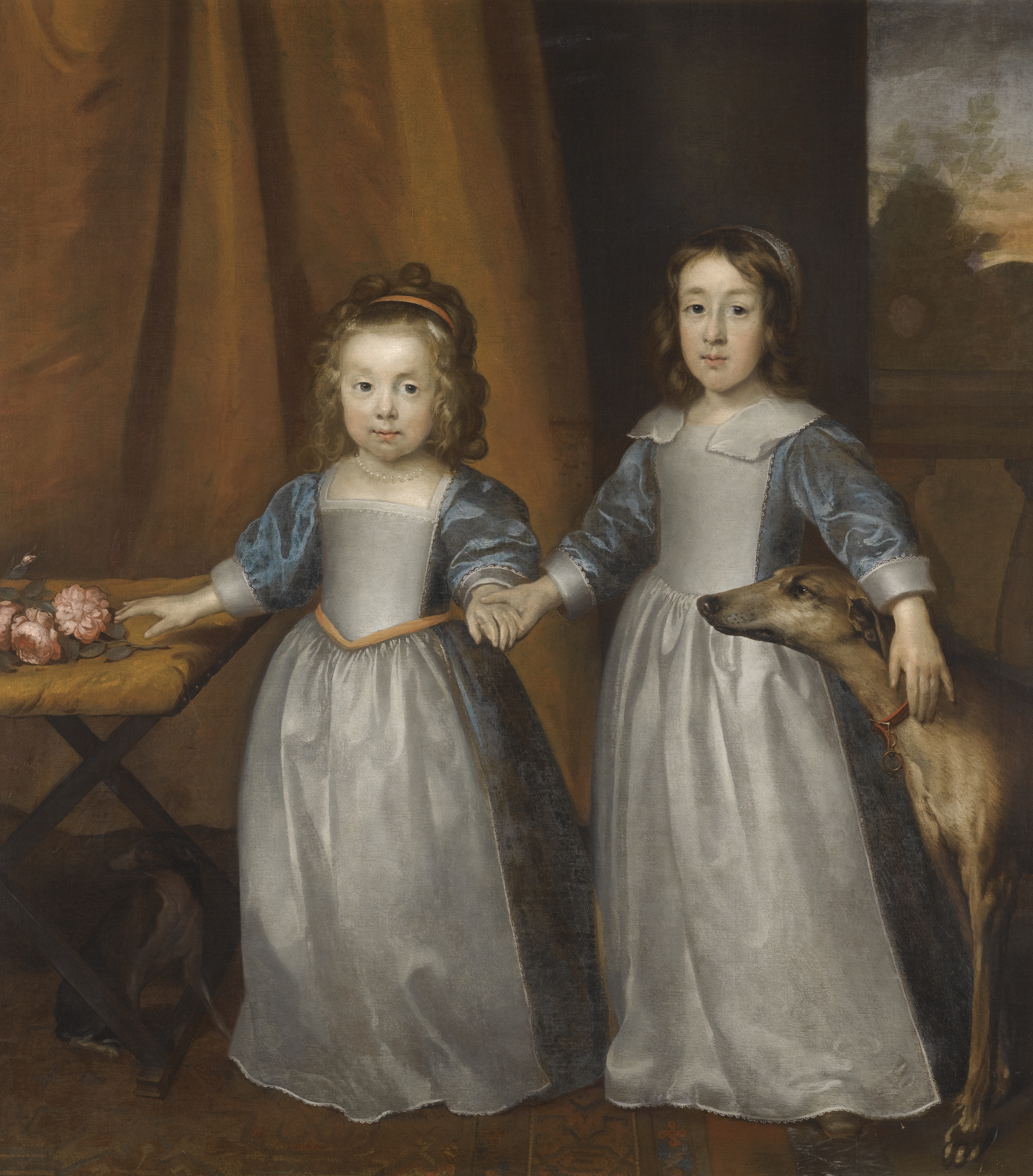
Two Young Girls on a Terrace with Two Hounds, 1648

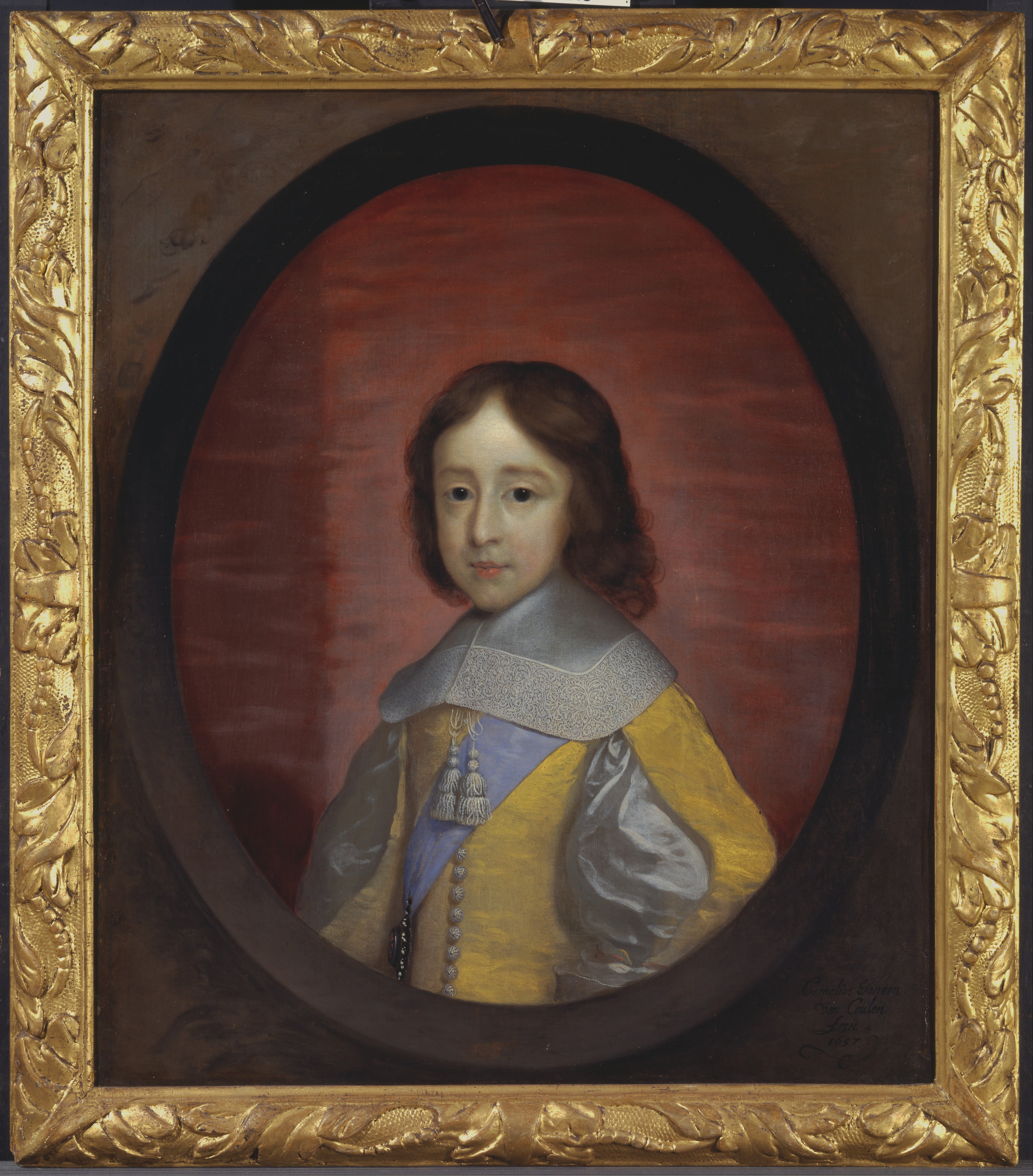
William III, Prince of Orange, as a child, 1657 at the Yale Center for British Art

== Sources ==
- Finberg, AJ, (1918). Two Anonymous Portraits by Cornelius Johnson Walpole Society
- Finberg, Alexande Joseph, (1922). A Chronological List of Portraits by Cornelius Johnson, Or Jonson, Walpole Society
- Hearn, Karen, (2003). "The English Career of Cornelius Johnson" in Roding, Juliette Dutch and Flemish Artists in Britain 1550–1800, Primavera Pers
- Hearn, Karen (2015). Cornelius Johnson. Paul Holberton publishing.
- Cornelius Johnson, Painter to King and Country. The Weiss Gallery. 2016.
- Hearn, Karen (2018). "The 'small oil colour pictures' of Cornelius Johnson (1593–1661)". Portrait Miniatures, Artists, Functions & Collections. The Tansey Miniatures Foundation. pp. 179–88.
