= Chipchase =

Chipchase is a surname. Notable people with the name include:

- Bill Chipchase (1885–1941), Canadian ice hockey player
- Graham Chipchase (born 1963), British businessman
- Ian Chipchase (born 1952), English field athlete
- Jack Chipchase (born 1945), Canadian ice hockey player and coach
- Jan Chipchase, founder of Studio D Radiodurans
- Lyn Bell (now Lynette Chipchase) (born 1947), Australian freestyle swimmer
