= Herne Bay (disambiguation) =

Herne Bay is a town in Kent, England.

Herne Bay may also refer to:

== Places ==
- Herne Bay, New Zealand, a suburb of Auckland
- Riverwood, New South Wales, Australia (formerly known as Herne Bay)

== Military ==
- HMS Herne Bay (K611), anti-aircraft frigate of the British Royal Navy
- Royal Naval Hospital, Herne Bay, Herne Bay, New South Wales, Australia

== Other uses ==
- Herne Bay F.C., based in Herne Bay, Kent, England, UK
- Herne Bay Pier, the third pier at Herne Bay, Kent, England, UK
- Herne Bay railway station, at Herne Bay, Kent, England, UK
- Herne Bay High School, at Herne Bay, Kent, England, UK

== See also ==
- Herne (disambiguation)
