= Hearn family =

Historical family

The Hearn family is a family of Anglo-Norman origin. The name's original spelling in the 11th century was Heron or Heroun. As early as the 17th century, the variant spellings Hearn, Hearne, and Harn would also appear in England and the United States.

The Hearn family has sometimes been incorrectly linked with the Irish ancestral name Hearn.

== Origin ==
The surname Hearn is thought to be derived from Hairun, a settlement near Rouen, Normandy. The name can be traced back to the English settlement after the Norman Conquest. The Clan Heron, a border-raiding clan along the Anglo-Scottish border, would settle at Chipchase Castle in the 17th century.

== History ==
=== In England ===
After the name's establishment in England from its Norman origin of Hairun in the eleventh century, numerous variations in the name's spelling would develop, including Heiron, Heron, and Herne. Alternate uses of the word occur in Old English as hyrne, meaning a nook or a corner of land or in a bend. In a glossary originating from Newcastle upon Tyne in 1825, both Hearn and Harn were used interchangeably to refer to a "coarse linen cloth" among the citizens of Newcastle.

The variant spelling Heron has incorrectly led the name to be confused with the Irish name O'Heron (of which later variations would also include Heron and Hearn), an Anglicized form of the Gaelic Ó hUidhrín.

=== Heron baronets ===
The Heron Baronetcy, of Chipchase, was created on 20 November 1662 in the Baronetage of England by Charles II for Cuthbert Heron of Chipchase Castle, Northumberland in recognition of the loyalty shown to the King's father Charles I.

=== Arrival in the United States ===
==== William Hearne (1627–1691) ====
The Hearn family's arrival in the United States was a result of William Hearne, born in 1627 in London, son of baron Jordan Heron. Hearne was a Captain in Oliver Cromwell's army, and would later maintain a successful business enterprise in London selling Muscovado sugar from the West Indies between 1680 and 1688. Around 1688, William immigrated to America with his wife, Mary (née Cuthbert), settling on the border of contemporary Maryland and Delaware in Somerset County, United States, where he died in 1691.

After his death, the Hearne estate in Maryland, nicknamed "St. Kitts" after Saint Kitts and Nevis, was occupied by his descendants for nearly two-hundred years. Variations and alternate spellings of the family name would occur onward from the seventeenth and eighteenth-centuries in both England and the United States, including Hearne and Harn.

== Armigerous Hearns ==
The coat of arms granted to Daniel James Hearn, of Correa, co. Westmeath, the use of which being restricted to his descendants, are canting arms, bearing three heron, which have been closely associated with the name.

Sir Nicholas Hearn (1540–1608), who was knighted in Drogheda, Ireland by Sir Henry Sidney in 1566, used as his motto the phrase 'Leges, juraque servat'—'He maintains the laws and his rights.'

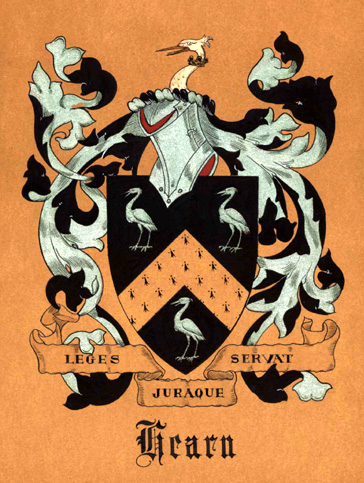
Coat of Arms of Hearn of Correa

== See also ==
- Heron (surname), a variant spelling of the Hearn family name
- List of people with the surname Hearn

== Sources ==
- Brockett, John Trotter (1825). A Glossary of North Country Words, in Use: From an Original Manuscript, in the Library of John George Lambton, Esq., M. P., with Considerable Additions. E. Charney.
- Burke, Bernard (1884). The General Armory of England, Scotland, Ireland and Wales. London, England: Harrison & Sons.
- Fox, Robert (1831). The History of Godmanchester. London, England: Baldwin and Cradock.
- Hanks, Patrick, ed. (2003). Dictionary of American Family Names. Oxford, England: Oxford University Press. ISBN 978-0-199-77169-1.
- Hearne, William Thomas (1907). Brief history and Genealogy of the Hearne Family from A. D. 1066, when they went from Normandy with William the Conqueror over to England, down to 1680, when William Hearne the London merchant came to America, and on down to A. D. 1907. Independence, Missouri: Press of Examiner Printing Co.
- Kennard, Nina H. (1912). Lafcadio Hearn. New York City, New York: D. Appleton & Company.
- Kimber, Edward; Johnson, Richard (1771). The Baronetage of England, Containing a Genealogical and Historical Account of all the Baronetcies Now Existing. Vol. 2. London, England.
- Reaney, Percy Hide; Wilson, Richard Middlewood (1991). A Dictionary of English Surnames. London, England: Routledge. ISBN 978-0-415-05737-0.
- The Norman People and Their Existing Descendants in the British Dominions and the United States of America. London, England: Henry S. King & Co. 1874.
