= Aoife Mulholland =

Irish actress (born 1982)

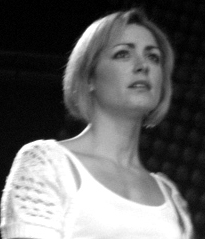
- Mulholland in 2007

Background information
- Born: Aoife Mulholland; Galway, Ireland
- Genres: Pop, musicals
- Instrument: Singing
- Years active: 2001 – present

Aoife Mulholland (/ˈiːfə/ EE-fə; born 29 May 1982) is an Irish actress and musical theatre performer from Salthill, Galway. Aoife is a successful leading lady in London's West End. She has starred as Roxie Hart (twice) in Chicago, at the Cambridge Theatre and for 18 months as Maria von Trapp in The Sound of Music at the London Palladium; and as Brooke Wyndham in Legally Blonde at the Savoy Theatre. She has also appeared in concerts, films and several popular TV series.

== Career ==
=== Maria and after ===
Mulholland was first seen nationally in 2006 on the hit BBC TV show How Do You Solve A Problem Like Maria? (HDYSAPLM). Appearing on the show with her best friend, Abi Finley, Mulholland reached the semi-final, but lost out to Siobhan Dillon in the sing-off in the fifth week, singing "Don't Cry For Me Argentina".

Mulholland admitted on HDYSAPLM that when she first started out she had to sell her car after moving to London, to be able to afford to continue in her chosen career, so determined was she to succeed in London's West End. On achieving success, Mulholland said in an interview, "If anyone had said a year ago that I'd be in one West End show, never mind two, I'd have never believed it," she said. "This all feels like a dream."

On appearing in HDYSAPLM? Mulholland said, "It was very, very tough. My goal from the beginning had been to make it to the final and then let the public decide. So when I got voted out, I was absolutely devastated. I was so close and knocked at the final hurdle! It was a big shock to the system." Andrew Lloyd Webber has since admitted that he made a mistake in sending her home too early from the BBC show, and is now immensely proud of the singer and her performances at the London Palladium as Maria; Lloyd Webber announced her recruitment saying her audition was "sensational."

=== West End leading lady ===
Shortly after HDYSAPLM finished in December 2006 Mulholland was signed by agents Curtis Brown and promptly took on the part of Roxie Hart, a lead character in the West End musical Chicago. She received positive reviews in Broadway.com and The Irish World.

Mulholland left the cast of Chicago at the end of March 2007. That December, she was invited back to attend the 10 Year Charity Gala performance and Black Tie Reception to celebrate the production's tenth anniversary. Mulholland performed "Funny Honey" in duet with Denise van Outen.

Although she did not win HDYSAPLM, Mulholland was asked by Andrew Lloyd Webber to take over the role of Maria in The Sound of Music as an 'alternate' on Monday evenings and Wednesday matinees from 16 April 2007, after the winner Connie Fisher had to scale down from eight to six performances a week following medical advice. In the role of Maria, Mulholland has received strong reviews: Megan Reynolds of The Guardian wrote that her performance was "honest, genuine, heartfelt and passionate, and her songs were pitch-perfect." On 26 February 2008, Summer Strallen took over the role of Maria from Fisher. Mulholland continued to perform as the alternate until 20 August 2008.

On Friday 24 August 2007 Mulholland performed at the BBC Radio 2 Gala for Andrew Lloyd Webber. Mulholland sang "All The Love I Have" from The Beautiful Game. On 29 November 2007 Mulholland sang jazz and swing numbers at the 100 Club in London fronting the Sorrentino Band. On Christmas Eve 2007, the BBC broadcast a show called When Joseph met Maria! in which she performed with Lee Mead and Connie Fisher and some of the other Maria and Joseph finalists in a BBC special.

On 12 and 13 May 2008, Mulholland appeared at the Royal Albert Hall in Sir Tim Rice's concert revival of his hit musical Chess, with Josh Groban as Anatoly Sergievsky, Idina Menzel as Florence, Adam Pascal as Frederick Trumper, Kerry Ellis as Svetlana and Marti Pellow as the Arbiter.

Mulholland has represented Andrew Lloyd Webber's production The Sound of Music twice at the free event West End Live held in 2007 and 2008. Between 3 and 5 July 2008, Mulholland starred in her own sold-out show, Sway with Aoife, at the Town Hall Theatre, Galway. An album recorded during these shows was released on her website. On 18 September 2008 Mulholland starred with the RTÉ Orchestra and Jessie Buckley in Dublin at the Concert Hall, in a Radio Broadcast highlighting songs from the career of Lloyd Webber, who joined her on stage.

At the end of 2008, after leaving The Sound of Music, Mulholland presented a morning report on the Von Trapp family home for BBC Breakfast News. She also worked with the RTÉ children's television programme, Jam the Musical, as a mentor for a group of children rehearsing in a competition for a musical theatre performance.

In November 2008, Mulholland reprised the role of Roxie Hart in Chicago until 12 July 2009, this time starring with both Justin Lee Collins and Jerry Springer.

She was next cast as Brooke Wyndham, in the musical Legally Blonde in London's Savoy Theatre, co-starring with Sheridan Smith, Duncan James and Alex Gaumond. She performed the role from the shows opening (5 December 2009) until late 2010.

== Personal life ==
=== Early life ===
Mulholland is the youngest of four siblings. Her parents are politician John Mulholland and Margaret Flynn; she has two brothers and a sister. She attended the National University of Ireland, Galway, University College Dublin, and the Central School of Speech and Drama (CSSD).

She comes from Salthill, a seaside resort in Galway, Ireland. Her grandparents owned a pub, and her grandfather was often the main entertainer; Mulholland has said, "When her family get together there's always a sing-song. I come from a very musical family – every year we would meet on Christmas night and all the kids were encouraged to get up and perform. I think it was then that I realised I loved singing." The first musical Mulholland appeared in was an amateur production of The Sound of Music, where she played Brigitta. Shortly before starting her course at the Central School of Speech and Drama, she moved to London and successfully auditioned for a part as a traditional Irish dancer in the professional dance show, Dance of Desire, in which she spent four months. In 2003, she became the 30th annual 'Galway Rose', and represented Galway at The Rose of Tralee contest.

=== Education ===
In addition to singing soprano, she dances and plays the piano. Mulholland has attained Grade 8 in piano and singing. She studied music at University College Dublin and did a postgraduate diploma in Business Studies at the National University of Ireland, Galway. She then went on to train at London's Central School of Speech and Drama. Mulholland graduated from CSSD with a master's degree in Acting and Musical Theatre. Whilst training at CSSD, she appeared in many student productions, including Beckett's Play and Come and Go (both directed by Lucy Bailey) as well as The Winter's Tale and The Bright Sun Brings it to Light. And with the Galway Musical Society, she played Peggy Sawyer in 42nd Street. While as Annie Oakley in Annie Get Your Gun, she was nominated for an A.I.M.S. Best Actress Award.

=== Marriage ===
Mulholland married Jason Molins, a former captain of the Irish national cricket team, in 2009, in a ceremony in Spain.

== Work and appearances ==
=== Inspiration ===
Mulholland has said her favourite character is Eliza Doolittle from My Fair Lady. "I love her transformation from a rough and ready girl to a sophisticated lady". And she credits influences such as Julie Andrews, Judy Garland, and Dionne Warwick. She recalled the best piece of advice she received was: "Believe in yourself. There are plenty of people in life waiting to knock you down but if you have confidence in your talent, in your own ability, nobody can take that away from you and you will succeed. Never give up. Learn from your mistakes and move on."

=== Musical theatre ===
Start year	Production	Venue	Role	Notes and information
2005	Annie Get Your Gun	Galway, Ireland	Annie Oakley	received an AIMS 'Best Actress' nomination
2006	Chicago	Cambridge Theatre, London	Roxie Hart	First West End lead role
2007	The Sound of Music	London Palladium, London	Maria von Trapp	Lead role (alternate)
2008	Chess	Royal Albert Hall, London	'Chess in Concert Company'	Released on region-free DVD (Reprise 2-517636)
2008	Chicago	Cambridge Theatre, London	Roxie Hart	Reprised Her Role – From 8 Nov – 9 July
2009	Legally Blonde	Savoy Theatre, London	Brooke Wyndham	From 9 December 2009 – December 2010

=== Television ===
Year	TV Company	TV series	Role	Notes
2004	RTÉ	Foreign Exchange	Shop Assistant	First Major TV Role
2006	BBC	How Do You Solve A Problem Like Maria?	Herself – To Play Maria In The Sound of Music	Contestant – semi-finalist – May To August
2007	BBC	When Joseph Met Maria	Herself – With 'Maria' And 'Joseph' Finalists	Christmas Themed Musical Show – Christmas-Eve
2008	RTÉ	Jam The Musical	Herself – Mentor	Mentor To Young Aspiring Musical Performers
2008	BBC	BBC News	Herself – Guest News Reporter	Morning News Report on the Von Trapp Family Home
2009	PBS	Chess in Concert	Soloist – Chess in Concert Company	Great Performances premiere 17 June 2009

=== Film ===
Year	Film title	Role	Notes
2000	Malicious Intent	PC Hannigan	First Major Film role Malicious Intent at IMDb
2008	The Best Years	Atlanta Earle	(in production) The Best Years at IMDb

=== Other performances ===
Year	Production	Production Type	Role Or Performance	Notes And Information
2003	Rose of Tralee	Festival (Trad)	Herself – Galway Rose	A Traditional Irish Festival And Talent Show
2005	Come and Go and Play	Play	Lead Roles	Both Directed by Lucy Baily And Both Received Critical Acclaim
2007	Chicago 10 Year Charity Gala	Musical Theatre	Roxie Hart	Denise van Outen joined Aoife Mullholland to sing "Funny Honey", along with other past Chicago stars.
2007	BBC Radio 2 Gala for Lloyd Webber	Radio Concert	Lead Vocalist	Hosted by Denise Van Outen with Lee Mead, Connie Fisher, Stephen Gately and Duncan James
2008	Sway With Aoife	Concert	Herself – A Retrospective	With Heather Weir, Morgan Crowly, Barry Duffy and Fergal Gallaher at the Townhall Theatre, Galway
2008	RTÉ Celebrates Lloyd Webber	Radio Concert	Lead Vocalist	Dublin Concert Hall With Alex Sharpe, David Shannon, Michael McCarthy And Jessie Buckley

=== Discography ===
==== Studio and live recordings ====
Year	Album title	Notes	Label
2008	Aoife: Live From Galway	debut album released 29 September 2008	Official Website

==== Cast recordings ====
Year	Album title	Notes	Label
2009	Chess in Concert	Live Recording of 2008 Royal Albert Hall Performance	Reprise Records
2009	Highlights from Chess in Concert	Live highlight recording of 2008 Royal Albert Hall performance	Reprise Records

== See also ==
- Aoife
