= Tommy Nicholas =

American software developer

Tommy Nicholas is an American entrepreneur and software developer. He is the co-founder and CEO of Alloy, a financial technology company that provides an identity decisioning and risk management platform for financial institutions and fintech firms.

== Early life and education ==
Nicholas attended the Maggie Walker Governor's School from 2004 to 2007. He began his undergraduate studies at Virginia Commonwealth University (VCU) before transferring to the University of Virginia (UVA) where he graduated with a bachelor's degree in 2011.

== Career ==
In 2011, Nicholas founded The City Swig, a web startup based in Charlottesville, Virginia, focused on real-time deals for the nightlife industry. Following this, he worked as a software developer for SHOCKOE.COM LLC in Richmond, Virginia, where he built mobile applications.

Between 2013 and 2014, Nicholas operated an independent web and mobile freelancing business. During this period, he contributed to the development of Coffitivity, a website designed to mimic the ambient noise of a coffee shop to boost productivity.

From January 2014 to January 2015, Nicholas worked at Knox Payments as the Head of Product.

In February 2015, Nicholas co-founded Alloy, a financial technology company that provides an identity decisioning and risk management platform for financial institutions and fintech companies, with Laura Spiekerman and Charles Hearn in New York City. As CEO, he has led the company in developing an identity decisioning platform that helps banks and fintech companies manage compliance (KYC/AML), fraud, and credit risk. In October 2021, Alloy achieved "unicorn" status with a valuation of $1.35 billion, a figure that rose to $1.55 billion in September 2022 following a Series C extension. On 1 March 2024, Tommy Nicholas’s company Alloy launched an embedded compliance risk platform called Alloy for Embedded Finance for banks and fintechs.

Under his leadership, in 2025 Alloy was named to the Forbes Fintech 50 List and to the World’s Top Fintech Companies List by CNBC.
