= Fred Ahern =

Fred or Frederick Ahern may refer to:

- Fred Ahern (ice hockey) (born 1952), American ice hockey player
- Frederick Ahern (1907–1982), American filmmaker
- Fred Ahern (equestrian) (1900–1958), Irish equestrian
- Fred M. Ahern (1884–1950), New York politician
