= Esuvii =

Gallic tribe

The Esuvii (or Esubii; Gaulish: Esuuii), or Atesui, were a Gallic tribe dwelling between the lower Seine and the Loire river, in what is now Normandy, during the Iron Age and the Roman period. They were later known as the Sagii during the late Roman period.

== Names ==
=== Esuvii ===
They are mentioned as Esuvii (var. Essuvii, Sesuvii) by Caesar (mid-1st c. BC).

The ethnic name Esuvii has been traditionally compared with the theonym Esus, leading to interpretations such as 'sons of Esus' or 'those belonging to Esus'. Inscriptions and coinage attest the Celtic personal names Esuvius and Esuvia, which likely supports Esuvii as the original form among the manuscript variants. However, as noted by Andres Hofeneder, even if Esuvii is the correct form, this does not necessarily imply a theophoric meaning. The name Esus may have had an appellative character and could therefore have been reused in the formation of personal names (as in Esumagius, Esumopas, Esugenus), and in ethnonyms such as Esuvii as well.

=== Atesui ===
The Esuvii are generally identified with the otherwise obscure Atesui, mentioned only by Pliny in the 1st century AD, on the basis of the similarity between their names. One proposed explanation is that Atesui represents a mistaken joining of two words, at Esui, separating the Latin conjunction at ('but, on the other hand') from the name Esui.

=== Sagii ===
The name Sagii (or Saii), which replaced the earlier Esuvii, is attested in Late Antiquity and the early Middle Ages in the forms civitas Saiorum (Notitia Galliarum, 400 AD) and Sagensis pagus (854), both referring to modern Sées.

Stefan Zimmer has connected the ethnonym Sagii to the Gaulish verbal root sag(i)- ('to track, to trace'), yielding the interpretation 'skilled trackers'.

The toponym Sées, attested as civitas Saiorum ca. 400 AD (Sagensis pagus in 854, Sagio, in 991–6, Saxio in 1024) derives from the name through a phonetic development from Sagii to Saii.

== Geography ==
The Esuvii lived in and around the present-day town of Sées (Orne), between the Coriosolites and the Aulerci. Their territory was situated between the lower Sequana (Seine) and the Liger (Loire) river. Pliny places the Atesui in Gallia Lugdunensis but provides little further information about their location. In this passage, his list of the province's peoples follows no apparent logical order, making their geographical location difficult to determine.

During the Roman period, their chief town was known as civitas Saiorum (modern Sées, Orne) and the people of the region as the Sagii. Raoul Doranlo suggested that the territory of the Esuvii was divided under Roman rule to form the civitates of the Viducasses, Bodiocasses and Sagii. On this view, Pliny's mention of Atesui in the 1st century AD may indicate that they retained a small part of their former territory, corresponding to the area where the Sagii are later attested in the 4th century.

Another settlement, at Fontaine-les-Bassets, was occupied from the early 1st to the 3rd century AD. The reasons for its abandonment remain unknown. Together with Sées, it was one of the largest urban complex known within the civitas of the Esuvii and, later, that of the Sagii. It served as a major staging post on the Roman road linking Bayeux and Vieux to Chartres and Évreux. The site may have served as a secondary settlement near the boundary between the Sagii and Lexovii. Alternatively, it has been suggested that it was already the chief town of the Esuvii, since the name Sagii is not attested in ancient sources before the 3rd–4th centuries. This late attestation raises the possibility that two civitates existed in succession or were later merged.

== History ==
In 57 BC, the Esuvii were subdued by Publius Crassus and took part in the western Gallic uprising against Roman forces in the following year.

From the 3rd–4th centuries AD, they were succeeded by the Sagii in the same territory.

== See also ==
- List of Gaulish tribes
- Esuvia gens
