= Dan Ahern =

American football player (1898–1963)

Profile
- Position: Tackle

Personal information
- Born: February 15, 1898; Manchester, New Hampshire, U.S.
- Died: August 31, 1963 (aged 65); Washington, D.C., U.S.
- Listed height: 6 ft 2 in (1.88 m)
- Listed weight: 200 lb (91 kg)

Career information
- High school: Manchester Central (NH)
- College: Georgetown

Career history
- Washington Senators (1921)

Career NFL statistics
- Games played: 3
- Stats at Pro Football Reference

Daniel Francis Ahern (February 15, 1898 – August 31, 1963) was an American football tackle who played one season in the American Professional Football Association (APFA) for the Washington Senators. He played 3 games and started 2.
