= Robert Fox (antiquarian) =

British antiquarian

Robert Fox (2 March 1798, Godmanchester, England – 7 June 1843, Godmanchester) was an English antiquarian.

== Life ==
He was the second surviving son of John Fox (1748-1817), cabinet maker and upholsterer, of Huntingdon, and second wife, Frances Maples (1760-1845).

Fox was admitted a member of the Royal College of Surgeons on 5 March 1819, and practised in Huntingdon and the neighbourhood. He was the founder of the Literary and Scientific Institution of Huntingdon in 1841, and was himself an able lecturer on subjects connected with antiquities, geology, natural history, and philosophy. His only publication, The History of Godmanchester, in the county of Huntingdon, 8vo, London, 1831, one of the best of its class, gained him admission to the Society of Antiquaries. He was also a member of the Numismatic Society. In 1826 and 1831 he served as a bailiff of Godmanchester.

== Family ==
In 1821 at Godmanchester he married firstly Jane Ashton (1792-1831), daughter of Edward Ashton, of Old Weston, Huntingdonshire, and they had five children, three died young; her sister Elizabeth had married his elder brother, George Morris Fox in 1818. Their two surviving sons were Dr. Henry Erasmus Fox (1825-1869) and Conrad Fox (1826-1871), chemist, druggist, who went to New York. Jane Fox died in 1831.

In 1832 he married secondly Anne Taylor (1806–1877), sister of Rev. Richard Taylor who had married his youngest sister Mary Caroline Fox in 1829. She was the only daughter of Richard Taylor (1762-1818) and Catherine Spencer (1769-1810), and they had one daughter, Anne Taylor Fox (1839 Letwell, Yorkshire-1893 Godmanchester), who died unmarried.

== Death ==
Fox died in Godmanchester on 8 June 1843, aged forty-five, highly regarded for his benevolence.

Fox left a small but choice collection of coins and antiquities, mostly local 'finds.' This, together with his philosophical apparatus, was purchased by subscription after his death, and placed in the Huntingdon Literary and Scientific Institution as a testimonial to his memory.
