= Sid Hearn =

English cricketer

Sidney Hearn
Personal information
- Full name: Sidney George Hearn
- Born: 28 July 1899; Harbledown, Kent
- Died: 23 August 1963 (aged 64); Chartham, Kent
- Batting: Left-handed
- Bowling: Slow left arm orthodox
- Relatives: Peter Hearn (nephew)

Domestic team information
- Years: Team
- 1922–1926: Kent
- FC debut: 20 May 1922 Kent v Leicestershire
- Last FC: 26 June 1926 Kent v Northants

Career statistics
Competition	First-class
Matches	32
Runs scored	465
Batting average	12.56
100s/50s	0/2
Top score	54*
Balls bowled	927
Wickets	22
Bowling average	18.13
5 wickets in innings	0
10 wickets in match	0
Best bowling	3/15
Catches/stumpings	20/–
- Source: CricInfo, 30 October 2017

Sidney George Hearn (28 July 1899 – 23 August 1963), known as Sid Hearn, was an English first-class cricketer who played for Kent County Cricket Club between 1922 and 1926. He was born in Harbledown, Kent, and died at Chartham, also in Kent in 1963 aged 64.

Hearn played 32 first-class matches in his career, scoring 465 runs as a left-handed batsman and taking 22 wickets as a slow left arm bowler. He played 31 times for the Kent First XI and 45 times for the Second XI in the Minor Counties Championship.

Hearn's nephew Peter played for Kent between 1947 and 1956.

== Bibliography ==
- Carlaw, Derek (2020). Kent County Cricketers, A to Z: Part Two (1919–1939) (PDF). Cardiff: ACS.
