= William Hearn =

William Hearn may refer to:

- William Hearn (legal academic) (1826–1888), Australian university professor and politician
- William Hearn (umpire) (1849–1904), English cricketer and Test umpire
- William Hearn (rower) (1850–?), New Zealand sculler
