= Michael Ahern =

Michael or Mike Ahern may refer to:

- Michael Ahern (Irish politician) (born 1949), Irish Fianna Fáil politician and minister
- Mike Ahern (Australian politician) (1942–2023), Australian National Party politician and former Premier of Queensland
- Mick Ahern (1905–1946), Irish hurler

== See also ==
- Mick Aherne, Gaelic football and hurling
- Mike Ahearn, former Kansas State football coach
