= Peter Hearn =

English cricketer

Personal information
- Born: 19 September 1925; Tunbridge Wells, Kent
- Died: 25 March 2013 (aged 87); Tunbridge Wells, Kent
- Batting: Left-handed
- Bowling: Slow left arm
- Role: Batsman
- Relatives: Sid Hearn (uncle)

Domestic team information
- Years: Team
- 1947–1956: Kent
- FC debut: 31 May 1947 Kent v Warwickshire
- Last FC: 25 August 1956 Kent v Yorkshire

Career statistics
Competition	First-class
Matches	200
Runs scored	8,138
Batting average	25.51
100s/50s	7/46
Top score	172
Balls bowled	2,530
Wickets	22
Bowling average	56.59
5 wickets in innings	0
10 wickets in match	0
Best bowling	3/34
Catches/stumpings	60/–
- Source: CricInfo, 28 October 2017

Peter Hearn (18 November 1925 – 25 March 2013) was an English first-class cricketer who played for Kent County Cricket Club between 1947 and 1956. He was an elegant top-order batsman who scored over 8,000 runs for Kent and made a century on his debut for the county. He served during World War II in the Royal Engineers and spent time as a prisoner of war.

== Early life and war service ==
Hearn was born in Tunbridge Wells and educated at The Skinners' School in the town. His grandfather was the groundsman at the Nevill Ground and Hearn grew up at his cottage on the ground's boundary. His father played for Tunbridge Wells Cricket Club and his uncle, Sidney played for Kent in the 1920s. He played cricket at school and, in 1942, appeared as a teenager in a team organised by ex-Kent batsman CH Knott alongside, amongst others, Kent great Frank Woolley.

In 1943 Hearn joined the Royal Engineers during the Second World War. He was captured and spent time as a prisoner of war in Germany before being repatriated at the end of the war. He played some cricket whilst in the army and was still a serving soldier when he made his Kent debut in 1947.

== Cricket career ==
Hearn's first-class debut for Kent came at the end of May 1947 at Garrison Ground 2 in Gillingham against Warwickshire in the 1947 County Championship. He scored a century on his debut and, as an "elegant, left-handed" batsman he drew comparisons with Frank Woolley. Playing as a top-order batsman, Hearn made 196 appearances for Kent and became a regular in the county team after he completed his military service. He was awarded his county cap in 1947 and scored over 8,000 runs for Kent, making seven centuries for the county. His form could be inconsistent however and he was considered a "nervous starter" although he could play elegantly and he "rivalled the most attractive batsmen in the country" when he was in top form.

He appeared in 200 first-class matches, including three for Combined Services in 1947 and one for an Under-32 team in 1950. He scored 1,000 runs in a season three times and made 1,413 in 1954, including his career best score of 172 against Worcestershire, one of his seven centuries. He bowled occasional slow left arm spin, taking 22 wickets for Kent.

== Later life ==
Hearn was released by Kent after appearing only three times during the 1956 season. He played as a professional for Kirkcaldy Cricket Club in Scotland and then coached cricket at Tonbridge School in his native Kent. He played for Tunbridge Wells Cricket Club into his 40s.

Hearn died at Pembury in Kent in 2013 aged 87.
