= Taylor Hearn =

Taylor Hearn may refer to:

- Taylor Hearn (baseball) (born 1994), pitcher
- Taylor Hearn (American football) (born 1996), guard
