= Karen Hearn =

British art historian

Karen Hearn FSA is a British art historian and curator. She has Master's degrees from the University of Cambridge and the University of London. She is an Honorary Professor in the Department of English Language and Literature at the University College London. From 1992 to 2012 Hearn was the curator of sixteenth and seventeenth century British art at the Tate where she curated major exhibitions on Tudor and Jacobean paintings, Anthony van Dyck, and Rubens. She was co-curator of Royalist Refugees at The Rubenshuis in Antwerp. She has also curated exhibitions at the National Portrait Gallery, London, The Harley Gallery, and the Foundling Museum. She was elected as a Fellow of the Society of Antiquaries of London on 1 January 2005.

She researches, writes, teaches, lectures and broadcasts on art produced in Britain between about 1500 and about 1710, and in particular on the numerous Netherlandish-British artistic and cross-cultural links of that period.

Hearn also writes on the British career of Anthony van Dyck. In 2009 she curated the Tate Britain exhibition ‘Van Dyck & Britain’, and has subsequently published an essay on his London studio/workshop (2018).

For many years she has taught at university level on the centrality of migrant artists to 16th- and 17th-century (Tudor and Stuart period) British art.

== Select publications ==
- 1995. Karen Hearn ed., Dynasties: Painting in Tudor and Jacobean England 1530-1630.London: Tate, 1995.
- 2004. "Merchant Patrons for the Painter Siberechts", in Galinou, Mireille (ed) City Merchants and the Arts 1670-1720. Wetherby.
- 2004. 'A question of Judgement: Lucy Harington, Countess of Bedford as Art Patron & Collector' in Edward Chaney ed., Evolution of English Collecting. Yale U P, 2004.
- 2005. Nathaniel Bacon: Artist, Gentleman, Gardener. London, Tate Publishing.
- 2009. "Lady Anne Clifford's "Great Triptych"", in Hearn, K. and Hulse, L. (eds) Lady Anne Clifford: Culture, Patronage and Gender in Seventeenth-Century Britain. Leeds. 1-24.
- 2009. Karen Hearn ed., Van Dyck & Britain London: Tate, 2009.
- 2015. "'Picture-drawer, born at Antwerp': Migrant Artists in Jacobean London", in Painting in Britain 1500-1630: Production, Influences & Patronage. London, British Academy. 278-287.
- 2015. Cornelius Johnson. London, Paul Holberton: 2015.
- 2019. "'Wrought with flowers and leaves': Embroidery Depicted in Late Sixteenth- and Early Seventeenth-Century British Portraits – the Era of Rubens", in Lieneke Nijkamp & Abigail D. Newman (eds) Undressing Rubens: Fashion and Painting in Seventeenth-Century Antwerp. London & Turnhout. 31-46.
- 2020. Portraying Pregnancy: From Holbein to Social Media. London, Paul Holberton: 2020.
- 2022. 'A newly identified portrait by Sir Nathaniel Bacon', Burlington Magazine, vol.164, July 2022, 641-9.
- 2025. 'Painters and Scottish Patrons at the London Court of James VI & I, 1603-1625', in Art and Court of James VI & I, exhibition catalogue, Portrait Gallery, Edinburgh, 2025. 64-79.
