= Edward Hearn (rugby league) =

Australian rugby league footballer

Personal information
- Full name: Edward Hearn

Playing information
- Position: Five-eighth
Club
Years	Team	Pld	T	G	FG	P
1947–50	Parramatta	16	1	0	0	3

Edward Hearn nicknamed "Barney" was an Australian rugby league footballer who played in the 1940s and 1950s. He was a foundation player for Parramatta and played in the club's first game.

== Playing career ==
Hearn began his first grade career for newly admitted side Parramatta in 1947. Hearn was one of the players in the new team who had no previous first grade experience and was selected to play at five-eighth. Hearn played in Parramatta's first ever game on April 12, 1947, against Newtown at Cumberland Oval with the match ending in a 34–12 defeat. Hearn scored his first and only try for the club against North Sydney at the same venue in Round 3 which ended in a 22–19 defeat. Parramatta would go on to struggle for the entire season managing to win only 3 matches and finished last on the table.

Hearn played with Parramatta for another 3 seasons as the club struggled near the bottom of the ladder in 1948 and 1950 but almost made the finals in 1949 missing by 2 competition points.
