= John Ahern =

John Ahern may refer to:

- John Ahern (footballer) (born 1970), Australian rules footballer
- John Ahern (politician) (1934–2020), American politician
- John E. Ahern (1897–1969), Canadian politician
- John Ahern (bishop) (1911–1997), Irish Roman Catholic bishop
- John H. Ahern (1903–1961), British railway modeller and photographer
