= Lizzie Ahern =

Australian socialist propagandist

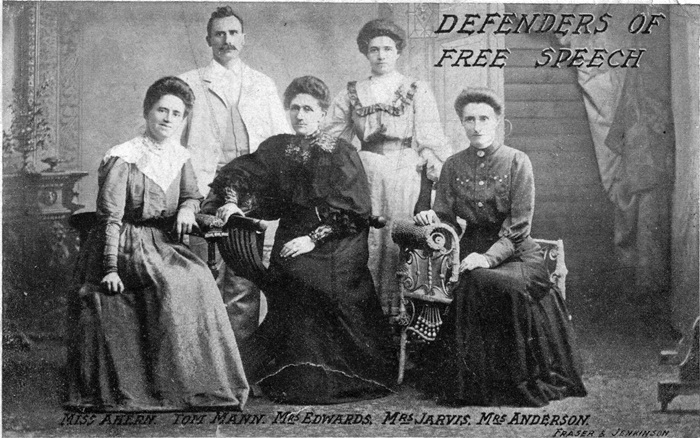
- "Defenders of Free Speech", a postcard published by the Victorian Socialist Party celebrating the Prahran Free Speech Fight. From left: Ahern, Tom Marn, Mrs Edwards, Mrs Anderson.
- Born: Elizabeth Ahern; 19 October 1877; Ballarat, Victoria, Australia
- Died: 7 April 1969 (aged 91)
- Occupations: Activist; trade unionist
- Organization: Victorian Socialist Party
- Spouse: Arthur Wallace (m. 1908)
- Children: 2
- Parents: Edmund Ahern; Eliza Kiely

Elizabeth Ahern (19 October 1877 – 7 April 1969) was an Australian political activist, trade unionist and socialist.

== Early life and education ==
Ahern was born in Ballarat, Victoria, Australia on 19 October 1877. Her father, Edmund Ahern, was a gold miner, and her mother was Eliza, née Kiely; both were from Ireland. Ahern left school when she was 14 years old, and worked as a pupil-teacher and then moved to Melbourne, where she worked in domestic service as a cook.

== Career ==
Ahern joined the Abbotsford branch of the Political Labor Council in 1904, and the Social Questions Committee, later renamed the Victorian Socialist Party, the following year. The Victorian Socialist Party was primarily interested in education and free speech and ran weekly meetings in the Bijou Theatre that often attracted crowds of more than 1,000 people. It also held meetings at Yarra Bank, which could attract tens of thousands. Ahern was one of the Party's most popular and effective speakers and spoke at their meetings on street corners as well as in rural areas. In November 1906 she was arrested and jailed for ten days; she had been campaigning for the Free Speech Campaign, which defended the right to speak in public places.

Ahern was a member of the Victorian Socialist Party's executive committee in 1906-08, 1910 and 1917–18; in 1906-07 she was a vice-president. She was a delegate to the Political Labor Council's annual conference in 1907 and helped to establish the Domestic Workers' Union and the Women's Socialist League. During World War I she campaigned against conscription and in 1916 she became secretary of the Women's Anti-Conscription Committee.

Ahern remained active with the Labor Women's Central Organizing Committee until 1934, and was a delegate to the first interstate conference of Labor women in 1929 and secretary to its executive in 1930. She became a Justice of the Peace and a children's court magistrate. Ahern was a member of the party's Albert Park branch until she died on 7 April 1969.

== Personal life ==
Ahern married Arthur Wallace of the Barrier Socialist Propaganda Group in a socialist wedding on 10 December 1908. They had two children together.
