= 3192 A'Hearn =

Main-belt asteroid

Discovery
- Discovered by: E. Bowell
- Discovery site: Anderson Mesa Stn.
- Discovery date: 30 January 1982

Designations
- Named after: Michael A'Hearn (astronomer)
- Alternative designations: 1982 BY_{1} · 1975 JN
- Minor planet category: main-belt · (inner)

Orbital characteristics
- Epoch 4 September 2017 (JD 2458000.5)
- Uncertainty parameter 0
- Observation arc: 41.29 yr (15,081 days)
- Aphelion: 2.7782 AU
- Perihelion: 1.9767 AU
- Semi-major axis: 2.3774 AU
- Eccentricity: 0.1686
- Orbital period (sidereal): 3.67 yr (1,339 days)
- Mean anomaly: 251.29°
- Mean motion: 0° 16^{m} 8.04^{s} / day
- Inclination: 2.8791°
- Longitude of ascending node: 56.726°
- Argument of perihelion: 91.584°

Physical characteristics
- Dimensions: 4.361±0.700; 5.66 km (calculated)
- Synodic rotation period: 3.160 h
- Geometric albedo: 0.20 (assumed); 0.354±0.166
- Spectral type: SMASS = C · C
- Absolute magnitude (H): 13.6

3192 A'Hearn, provisional designation 1982 BY_{1}, is a carbonaceous asteroid from the inner regions of the asteroid belt, about 6 kilometers in diameter. It was discovered by American astronomer Edward Bowell at Lowell's Anderson Mesa Station in Flagstaff, Arizona, on 30 January 1982.

== Orbit and classification ==
The C-type asteroid orbits the Sun in the inner main-belt at a distance of 2.0–2.8 AU once every 3 years and 8 months (1,339 days). Its orbit has an eccentricity of 0.17 and an inclination of 3° with respect to the ecliptic. The first precovery was obtained at El Leoncito in 1975, extending the asteroid's observation arc by 7 years prior to its discovery.

== Physical characteristics ==
A rotational lightcurve for this asteroid was obtained from photometric observations made by Japanese astronomer Sunao Hasegawa, using the 1.05-meter Schmidt telescope at Kiso Observatory in March 2004. It showed a well-defined rotation period of 3.16 hours with a brightness amplitude of 0.20 in magnitude (U=3). According to the survey carried out by NASA's Wide-field Infrared Survey Explorer with its subsequent NEOWISE mission, the asteroid measures 4.4 kilometers in diameter and its surface has a high albedo of 0.354. The Collaborative Asteroid Lightcurve Link assumes a standard albedo for stony asteroids of 0.20 – despite the fact that the body has been classified as a carbonaceous C-type – and calculates a diameter of 5.7 kilometers with an absolute magnitude of 13.6.

== Naming ==
This minor planet was named for American cometary astronomer and professor of astronomy at CMNS, Michael A'Hearn (1940-2017), known for his contribution to cometary science, especially for his wide-range spectroscopic and spectrophotometric observations. He led Deep Impact/EPOXI spacecraft mission and participated in IUE mission, which, in 1983, detected for the first time the presence of cometary diatomic sulfur while observing Comet IRAS–Araki–Alcock's spectrum. The official naming citation was published by the Minor Planet Center on 22 June 1986 (M.P.C. 10848).
