= Hernes =

Hernes may refer to:

- Ernesius (d. 1175), Catholic prelate
- Gudmund Hernes (born 1941), Norwegian politician
- Helga Hernes (born 1938), German-born Norwegian political scientist, diplomat, and politician

== See also ==
- Herne (disambiguation)
