= David Hearn =

David Hearn may refer to:

- David Hearn (canoeist) (born 1959), American slalom canoeist
- David Hearn (golfer) (born 1979), Canadian golfer
- David A. Hearn (1853–1920), Canadian lawyer
