= Jan Chipchase =

Jan Chipchase is a qualitative researcher, strategist, and consultant who is influential in the user research and human-centered design communities. He is the founder of Studio D Radiodurans, a research, design and strategy consultancy that specializes in understanding consumer behavior in emerging markets. He was previously Executive Creative Director of Global Insights at Frog Design, where he led the firm’s global research practice. Before joining Frog Design in 2010, Chipchase was principal scientist at Nokia, where he researched how technology works and is adopted in different cultures, with a focus on a time horizon of3 to 15 years.

He has lived in London, Berlin, San Francisco, Shanghai, Los Angeles, and is currently based in Tokyo. He holds 25 patents granted and pending.

== Early life and education ==
Chipchase was born in London to a German mother and British father. He was raised in London, Brighton, and Berlin.

Chipchase received a BA in Economics and a MSc in User Interface Design from London Guildhall University. He has described himself as a "failed economist" and a "failed academic".

== Publications ==
In 2010, Chipchase published "Mobile Money Afghanistan," a report on the nascent use of money through mobile phones.

In 2011, Chipchase published the results of a 6-month experiment "Red Mat" to explore the dynamics of crowd-sourcing in China. The experiment engaged hundreds of people in the act of making a giant Chinese flag out of pieces sourced from across China, without revealing what they were making to the participants. The experiment explores the question of whether it’s possible to engage hundreds of people in an act of subversion without any of the people knowing what they are subverting against, until that moment when the subversive act becomes clear. The experiment explores notions of nationalism, the state, morality, corporate ethics and behavior.

Chipchase has written for numerous international publications including Die Zeit, The Atlantic, Fast Company, National Geographic and a monthly column for China's Economic Observer, with his field-photography also appearing in GEO magazine. His first book entitled Hidden in Plain Sight was published by Harper Business and released in April 2013. Other books of his include Today's Office, and The Field Study Handbook, released for retail print in July 2017.

== Appearances and advisory roles ==
Chipchase has presented his work at the TED Conference, the World Bank, Pop! Tech, International CES, and The Economist’s Human Potential Conference.

His research has been featured in the New York Times Magazine, Businessweek, and The Economist, among others. In 2010, Fortune Magazine featured Chipchase as a prominent designer in "The Smartest People in Tech".

He sits on advisory boards for several organizations, including:

- The Broadcasting Board of Governor's Commission on Innovation
- Frontline SMS
- Pecha Kucha Foundation
- Makeshift Magazine
- The Institute for Money, Technology, and Financial Inclusion
