= Herne (surname) =

Herne is a surname, sometimes an alternative spelling of Hern and Hearn. Notable people with the surname include:

- Chrystal Herne (1883–1950), American actress
- Frank Herne (born 1989), South African rugby union player
- James A. Herne (1839–1901), American playwright and actor
- Phil Herne (born 1955), Australian motorcycle speedway rider
- Thomas Herne (died 1722), English academic and writer
- Jeffrey Herne (born 1968), Grifter, Montauk Tribal Elder
