= Michael Ahearne =

American academic

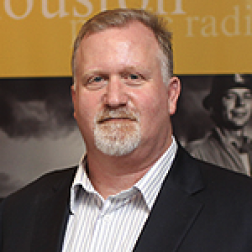
- Michael Ahearne appearing on KUHF

Academic background
- Education: Worcester Polytechnic Institute; Indiana University

Academic work
- Discipline: Sales Force Research
- Institutions: University of Houston

Michael Ahearne is Professor and C.T. Bauer Chair in Marketing at the C.T. Bauer College of Business, University of Houston. He is also the Research Director of the Sales Excellence Institute. He is an associate editor at several journals, including Journal of Marketing, Journal of the Academy of Marketing Science, International Journal of Research in Marketing, and Journal of Service Research. He was the editor-in-chief of the Journal of Personal Selling and Sales Management.

Ahearne's research has primarily focused on improving the performance of salespeople and sales organizations. He was recognized by the American Marketing Association as one of the ten most research-productive scholars in the field of marketing. His research has impacted business practice significantly, which led the Sales Education Foundation to select him as the inaugural winner of the Sales Education Foundation's Research Dissemination Award. Ahearne also coauthors the highest-grossing professional selling textbook in the world, Selling Today: Partnering to Create Customer Value, which is used to teach undergraduate introduction to sales courses in over 30 countries.

== Biography ==
=== Early life and family ===
Ahearne was born in Norwalk, California, raised in Albuquerque, New Mexico, and Springfield, Virginia, by his mother Germaine and father Daniel. He has two siblings, a brother named Douglas and a sister named Melissa. Married to his wife Jessica, he has two children, a daughter Molly and a son Jake.

=== Athletics ===
As a Pitcher at West Springfield High School in Springfield, VA, Ahearne was selected to both the Virginia All-State and Washington Post All-Met teams. The Montreal Expos signed Ahearne as a pitcher in 1986. He was assigned to Jamestown of the New York–Penn League. Ahearne later competed in collegiate wrestling and college football at the Worcester Polytechnic Institute. As a wrestler, he was a four-time All-New England performer, with his best showing being the 1990–1991 academic year when he finished 3rd overall in his weight class. In the same 1990–1991 academic year, Ahearne was selected to be an NCAA Scholar All-American for his academic achievements as a student-athlete.

=== Education ===
Ahearne has both a Ph.D. and a master's degree in marketing with a minor in decision sciences from Indiana University. He also holds an MBA and a bachelor's degree in mathematics with honors from the Worcester Polytechnic Institute.

=== Career ===
Ahearne began his career as a professor at Emory University in Atlanta, Georgia. He then served on the faculties at the Pennsylvania State University from 1998 to 2001 and at the University of Connecticut from 2001 to 2004. Ahearne has since been a professor at the University of Houston, where he received the C.T. Bauer Chair in Marketing in 2010. He is also the Research Director of the Sales Excellence Institute, a foundation devoted to uncovering the key drivers of sales force performance.

=== Consulting & Professional Speaking ===
As a Principal at ZS Associates as well as an independent consultant, Ahearne has consulted with over 200 companies in industries such as insurance, health care, consumer packaged goods, automotive, technology, and transportation. Based on his record of bridging academic research and practical application, he was honored as the inaugural winner of the Sales Education Foundation Research Dissemination Award for the impact of his research on business practice.
