= Charles J. Hearn =

American judge

Charles J. Hearn (March 20, 1931 – April 8, 2003) was a Texas state judge who received press coverage for sending notification of the execution order date to death row inmate Robert Nelson Drew with a signature followed by a smiley. The attorney for the Drew family commented, "It's like he's saying, 'Have a nice death.'".
