= Alloy (company) =

American financial technology company

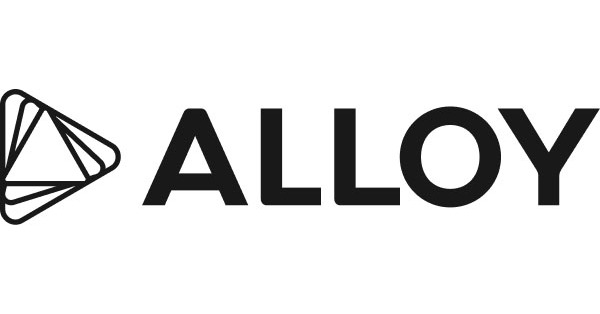
- Type: Private
- Industry: Financial technology; Identity verification; Fraud prevention; Compliance software
- Founded: 2015
- Founders: Tommy Nicholas; Laura Spiekerman; Charles Hearn
- Headquarters: New York City, New York, U.S.
- Area served: Worldwide
- Key people: Tommy Nicholas (CEO); Laura Spiekerman (President); Charles Hearn (CTO)
- Products: Identity decisioning platform; KYC/KYB verification; AML screening; Fraud detection and monitoring
- Website: alloy.com

Alloy is an American financial technology company that provides an identity decisioning and risk management platform used by banks, credit unions, and fintech companies to automate identity verification, fraud prevention, anti-money laundering screening, and credit underwriting.

== History ==
Alloy was founded in 2015 by Tommy Nicholas, Laura Spiekerman and Charles Hearn. In September 2019, Alloy announced a $12 million Series A round led by Bessemer Venture Partners. In 2020, the company closed a $40 million Series B round led by Canapi Ventures. In the same year, Alloy co-founder Charles Hearn was named to Forbes 30 Under 30.

In April 2021, the company announced an integration partnership with behavioral analytics firm Neuro-ID to make behavioral risk signals available within Alloy's identity decisioning workflows. In September 2021, Alloy raised a $100 million Series C round that gave the company a post-money valuation of approximately $1.35 billion, making it a fintech "unicorn".

In September 2022, Alloy raised an additional $52 million at a $1.55 billion valuation.

In February 2023, the company announced the official launch of its Identity Decisioning Platform in the UK to support banks and fintechs there.

In September, Alloy published an Embedded Finance report and commentary on how sponsor-bank/fintech partnerships are evolving amid regulatory pressure.

In October 2024, Alloy announced strategic partnerships with commercial-lending platform Numerated and embedded-finance provider Sonovate to deliver identity-risk and fraud-prevention capabilities to commercial lenders and embedded finance customers.

In January 2025, the company announced a partnership with the digital banking firm Q2 Holdings to deliver advanced fraud monitoring services for banks and credit unions.

On 18 February 2025, the company was named to Forbes' Fintech 50 list for 2025. In July, Alloy was recognized on CNBC's World's Top Fintech Companies 2025 list.

== Products and services ==
Alloy's product is commonly described as an "identity decisioning" or "identity operating" platform. It offers a centralized decision engine and workflow builder that orchestrates data from credit bureaus, identity providers, document verification services, and alternative data sources to automate KYC (Know Your Customer), KYB (Know Your Business), AML screening, and fraud detection rules. Customers can integrate via API or use Alloy's user interface for rule configuration, monitoring, and case management.

Alloy reports hundreds of customers among banks, credit unions, and fintechs globally, and states that its platform is used to manage onboarding, ongoing monitoring, and credit decisions at scale. The company states it serves organizations across multiple markets, enabling localized verification flows and a wide set of third-party data integrations.
