= John Hearn =

John Hearn or Hearne may refer to:

- John Hearn (politician) (1827–1894), Irish-born Canadian merchant and politician
- John Gabriel Hearn (1863–1927), Canadian businessman and political figure
- John Graham Hearn (1929–1980), British speed skater
- J. T. Hearne (1867–1944), British cricket bowler
- J. W. Hearne (1891–1965), British cricket all-rounder
- John Hearne (lawyer) (1893–1969), Irish legal scholar and diplomat
- John Hearne (writer) (1926–1994), Canadian-born Jamaican writer and educator
- John Hearne (composer) (born 1937), Scottish composer, conductor and singer
- Jack Hearn (born John Hearn; 1923–2026), British judo instructor
