= Aoife Ahern =

First woman Dean of Engineering at University College, Dublin

- Education: Trinity College Dublin; University College London
- Known for: Transport engineering

Aoife Ahern is the first woman to be dean of engineering at University College, Dublin.

== Biography ==
Ahern completed her degree in engineering in Trinity College Dublin in 1998 before going to London to the university, where she did a PhD. Ahern returned to Dublin, to lecture in Trinity from 2000 before joining University College Dublin in 2003. In 2016 Ahern became head of the school of Civil Engineering and then went on to become dean of engineering in UCD in 2019. In 2020 she was invited to become a Fellow of Engineers Ireland.
