= Azeline Hearne =

Azeline Hearne (c. 1825-1890?), was an American slave who was freed while she was in her 30s, and became famous for the numerous lawsuits brought against her during the Reconstruction era. Hearne was briefly one of the wealthiest landowners in Texas before being reduced to poverty through civil lawsuits considered by modern-day historians as unfair.

== Biography ==
During her time in slavery, she cohabited with her white slave owner, Samuel R. Hearne, for whom she bore four children. In 1853, the Hearnes moved to Robertson County, Texas. Upon his death in 1866, Sam Hearne bequeathed his estate to their twenty-year-old son with the provision he take care of Azeline. When the son subsequently died during the yellow fever epidemic in 1868, Azeline, as the sole legate, inherited his estate. Her inheritance made her one of the "wealthiest landowners in the county." In addition, Benjamin Brown, when he was supposed to help protect her holdings, committed fraud against Hearne, opening her up as an "easy target for predatory whites.

The white members of Hearne's family filed a claim to the land immediately after Sam Hearne died in 1866. In the years that followed, Azeline Hearne was sued numerous times over the estate, including once by her own lawyer, and became the first freedwoman to be party to three separate civil suits that were appealed all the way to the Texas Supreme Court, as well as the first freed slave in Robertson County, Texas to be indicted on charges of perjury. Hearne's case has been cited as a typical example of the unfair treatment received by former slaves in the post-Civil War south.

By the end of her life, she was forced to live in poverty and survived through help from her neighbors. Her last court case was lost in 1884, taking the rest of the land she had.

== See also ==
- Hearne, Texas
