= Hearn =

Hearn or Hearne may refer to:

== People ==
- List of people with the surname Hearn, Hearne, Hearns or Hearnes
- Hearn family, a family line of Anglo-Norman origin dating to 1066 A.D. in England
- Heron (surname), the original spelling of the Hearn name, of Anglo-Norman origin

== Places ==
- Hearn Generating Station, Toronto, Ontario, Canada
- Hearne, Saskatchewan, Canada
- Hearne, Texas, USA
- Hearnes Center, multi-purpose arena in Columbia, Missouri

== Institutions ==
- Horace Hearne Institute for theoretical physics at Louisiana State University

== See also ==
- Heron (disambiguation)
- Herne (disambiguation)
