= How Do You Solve a Problem like Maria? =

British television series

- Created by: Andrew Lloyd Webber; Gigi Eligoloff
- Presented by: Graham Norton
- Judges: Andrew Lloyd Webber; David Ian; John Barrowman; Zoe Tyler
- Country of origin: United Kingdom
- Original language: English
- No. of episodes: 8

Production
- Producer: BBC
- Running time: 30–90mins

Original release
- Network: BBC One
- Release: 29 July – 16 September 2006

Related
- Any Dream Will Do; I'd Do Anything; Over the Rainbow; When Joseph Met Maria; Grease Is the Word; Superstar; Let It Shine; Mamma Mia! I Have a Dream

How Do You Solve a Problem like Maria? is a British reality television talent show that documented the search for an undiscovered musical theatre performer to play the role of Maria von Trapp in the 2006 Andrew Lloyd Webber and David Ian stage production of The Sound of Music.

The series was originally devised by the then in-house development team at BBC Entertainment Events and was announced by the BBC in April 2006. BBC One broadcast the programme, which was hosted by Graham Norton, on Saturday evenings from 29 July through 16 September 2006.

The title derives from the refrain of "Maria", a song from the first act of The Sound of Music.

Connie Fisher won the final public vote, and with it a six-month contract to play Maria in the West End production.

== Format ==
=== Creation ===
The lead role of Maria von Trapp in the new West End production of The Sound of Music, to be staged by Andrew Lloyd Webber and David Ian, was to be played by American actress Scarlett Johansson. Negotiations fell through, and after a four-year search for an actress to fill the role, it was revealed in November 2005 that Lloyd Webber had approached the BBC to allow the public to cast the role through a Popstars-style talent search, the first time that such a format had been used.

This was the first programme to allow the public to cast a leading role in a West End show, and it was initially criticised. However, it won International Emmy and Royal Television Society awards and became the first of a series of collaborations between the BBC and Lloyd Webber, including Any Dream Will Do, I'd Do Anything, and Over the Rainbow. The series also led to versions and similar series abroad.

=== Expert panel ===
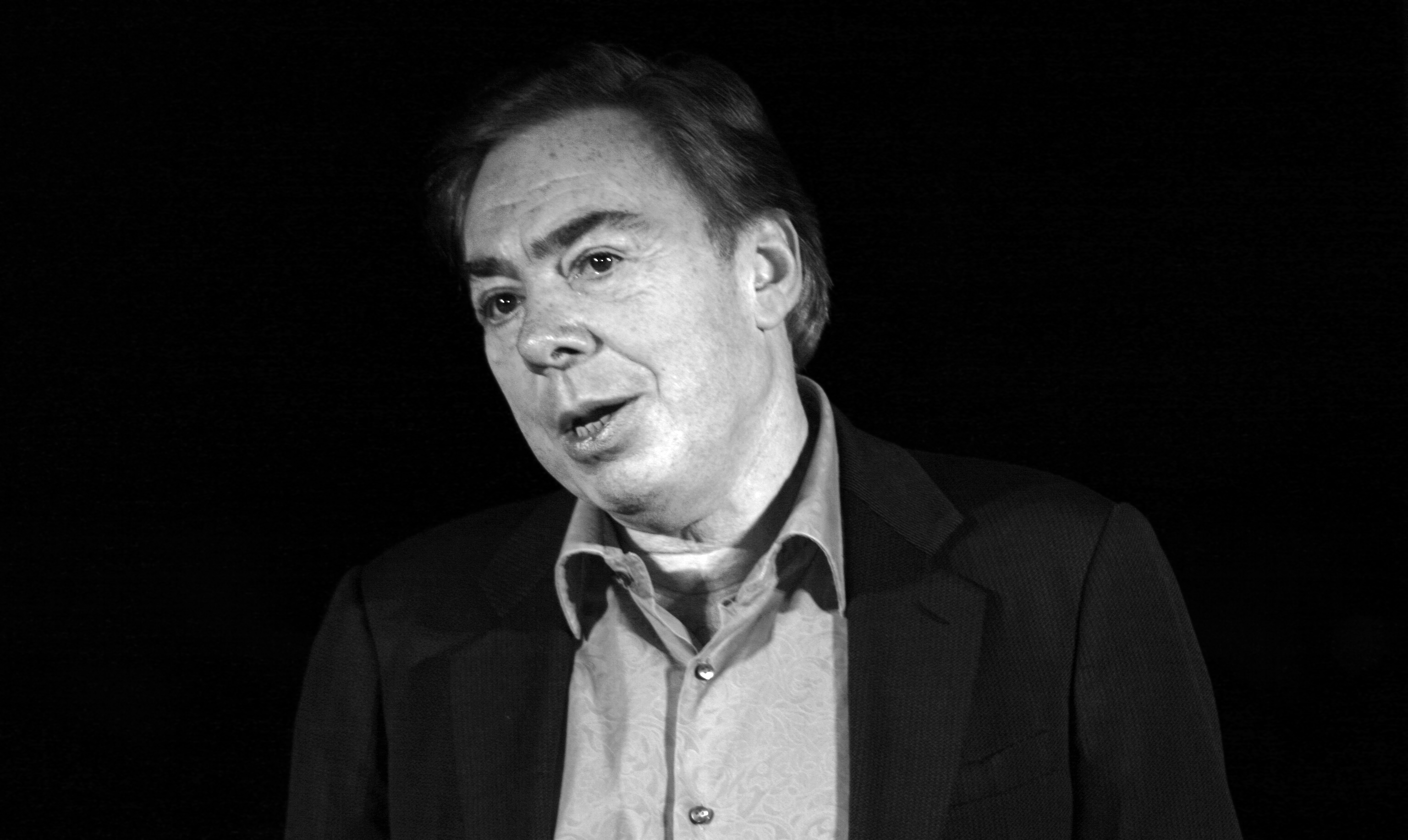
Andrew Lloyd Webber led the search for the musical theatre performer.

To assess and train the potential Marias and judge them during the live shows, an expert panel was chosen. The panel comprised:

- Andrew Lloyd Webber – musical theatre composer and producer, co-producer of the new stage production
- David Ian – theatre producer, co-producer of the new stage production
- John Barrowman – musical performer, dancer, singer and actor
- Zoe Tyler – voice coach, singer and performer, vocal coach to the finalists

Lloyd Webber also asked Denise van Outen to participate in the series, but she turned him down, saying that she "felt uncomfortable about being on the panel and giving my criticism". She later became a judge on follow-up series, Any Dream Will Do.

=== Auditions ===
Open auditions were held around the UK in April and May 2006, open to both professionals and amateurs over the age of 17. The top 200 made it through to the London callbacks where they performed for Ian, Barrowman and Tyler to secure one of 50 places at Lloyd Webber's "Maria School", where over four days they would receive vocal and drama training from the expert panel.

Several additional performers were selected over this fifty contestant limit; one being Briony, who had been rejected initially due to nerves hampering her performance, but who returned for a second chance and was allowed in by Ian. A further four, whom the panel had rejected, were contacted by Lloyd Webber himself as he personally believed them to be potential Marias.

During "Maria School", contestants were eliminated to leave twenty, who were then taken to Lloyd Webber's house, where they performed for fifty people from the entertainment business. Ten finalists were then chosen by the panel and taken through to the live studio finals.

The series started on Saturday 29 July 2006, and the first two programmes followed the audition stages of the competition before revealing the final ten at the end of the second programme.

=== Live finals ===
The final ten contestants then competed in the live studio finals held on Saturday nights over six weeks. Each week the contestants sang and performed during the live show, receiving comments from the judges following their performance. The public then got a chance to vote for their favourite Maria, and the two contestants with the fewest votes performed a sing-off in front of Lloyd Webber, who then decided which Maria to keep in the contest. This was repeated with the top ten, the top nine and the top eight. With the top seven and top five, two were voted off in the program, and there were two different sing-offs.

Lloyd Webber had no say in the final casting decision, when in the concluding edition of the series it was left to the public to choose who should play Maria out of the final two contenders, Connie Fisher and Helena Blackman. After more than 2 million votes were cast, the winning entrant was revealed as Fisher, who won a six-month contract to play Maria in the West End production, performing six out of the eight weekly shows.

The profits from the telephone votes went to a bursary for young performers. Lloyd Webber also donated his fee to the bursary.

== Finalists ==
Ten potential Marias were selected as finalists who would appear on the live shows. Abi Finley and Aoife Mulholland auditioned together having known each other from college, and both made it to the finals. One of the original 10 finalists, Emilie Alford, withdrew from the competition after deciding it was not for her. She was replaced by Siobhan Dillon, who lost a place in the final ten following a sing-off against Alford and Laura Sicurello in front of Lloyd Webber. This earned her the nickname "Second Chance Maria".

Finalists
Finalist	Age*	From	Dress colour	Status
Laura Sicurello	26	Milton Keynes	Yellow	Eliminated 1st in Week 1
Belinda Evans	28	Somerset	Dark blue	Eliminated 2nd in Week 2
Meliz Serman	23	Chingford	Gold	Eliminated 3rd in Week 3
Simona Armstrong	28	Greenford	Purple	Eliminated 4th in Week 4
Leanne Dobinson	20	Colchester	Lilac	Eliminated 5th in Week 4
Abigail "Abi" Finley	23	Prestwich	Light blue	Eliminated 6th in Week 5
Aoife Mulholland	28	Salthill	Green	Eliminated 7th in Week 5
Siobhan Dillon	21	Staffordshire	Red	Third place (Eliminated in Week 6)
Helena Blackman	23	Southampton	Pink	Runner-up
Connie Fisher	23	Haverfordwest	Orange	Winner

*As of start of series

=== Results summary ===
Colour key

–	Contestant was in the bottom two and who was saved after the sing off
–	Contestant was eliminated after the sing off
–	Contestant who received the most public votes
–	Contestant who received the most public votes and won the competition

Weekly results per contestant
Contestant	Week 1	Week 2	Week 3	Week 4		Week 5		Final	
Contestant	Week 1	Week 2	Week 3	Part 1	Part 2	Part 1	Part 2	Part 1	Part 2
Connie Fisher	1st	Safe	Safe	Safe	Safe	Safe	Safe	Safe	Winner (week 6)
Helena Blackman	10th	Safe	7th	6th	6th	Safe	Safe	Safe	Runner-up (week 6)
Siobhan Dillon	Safe	Safe	Safe	Safe	Safe	Safe	3rd	Third Place	Eliminated (week 6)
Aoife Mulholland	Safe	Safe	Safe	Safe	Safe	4th	4th	Eliminated (week 5)	
Abi Finley	Safe	Safe	Safe	Safe	Safe	5th	Eliminated (week 5)		
Leanne Dobinson	Safe	Safe	Safe	Safe	5th	Eliminated (week 4)			
Simona Armstrong	Safe	Safe	Safe	7th	Eliminated (week 4)				
Meliz Serman	Safe	9th	8th	Eliminated (week 3)					
Belinda Evans	Safe	8th	Eliminated (week 2)						
Laura Sicurello	9th	Eliminated (week 1)							

== Live shows ==
The live shows saw the finalists eliminated one by one following both individual and group performances. Once eliminated, the leaving contestant ended the programme by leading a performance of "So Long, Farewell" from The Sound of Music with the remaining contestants.

=== Week 1 ===
Following the first week of competition. The show performances were:

- Group performances:
  - "How Do You Solve A Problem Like Maria?" (from The Sound of Music)
  - "I Have Confidence" (from The Sound of Music)

Contestants' performances on the first live show
Act	Performance Pair	Order	Song	Result
Leanne Dobinson	Pair 1	1	"It's Oh So Quiet" (Björk)	Safe
Laura Sicurello	Pair 1	2	"Torn" (Natalie Imbruglia)	Bottom two
Aoife Mulholland	Pair 2	3	"Runaway" (The Corrs)	Safe
Abi Finley	Pair 2	4	"Nobody Does It Better" (Carly Simon)	Safe
Siobhan Dillon	Pair 3	5	"Man! I Feel Like a Woman!" (Shania Twain)	Safe
Connie Fisher	Pair 3	6	"(You Make Me Feel Like) A Natural Woman" (Aretha Franklin)	Safe (Highest votes)
Simona Armstrong	Pair 4	7	"Over the Rainbow" (Eva Cassidy)	Safe
Belinda Evans	Pair 4	8	"Over the Rainbow" (Judy Garland)	Safe
Helena Blackman	Pair 5	9	"Crazy Chick" (Charlotte Church)	Bottom 2 (Lowest Votes)
Meliz Serman	Pair 5	10	"Son of a Preacher Man" (Dusty Springfield)	Safe

- Guest performance: "Iris" (Ronan Keating)
- Panel's verdict on who was Maria
  - John Barrowman: Connie
  - Zoe Tyler: Leanne
  - David Ian: Connie

Sing-Off

Act	Sing Off Song	Results
Laura Sicurello	"No Matter What" from Whistle Down the Wind	Eliminated
Helena Blackman	"No Matter What" from Whistle Down the Wind	Saved by Lloyd Webber

- Notes
  - It was revealed during the results show that Connie received the highest number of votes

=== Week 2 ===
As the mission for this week, the potential Marias performed a scene from the musical with an actor as Captain Von Trapp.

The show performances were:

- Group performances:
  - "My Favorite Things" (from The Sound of Music)
  - "Don't Rain on My Parade" (Barbra Streisand from Funny Girl)

Contestants' performances on the second live show
Act	Performance Pair	Order	Song	Result
Belinda Evans	Pair 1	1	"Fever" (Peggy Lee)	Bottom two
Abi Finley	Pair 1	2	"The Closest Thing to Crazy" (Katie Melua)	Safe
Simona Armstrong	Pair 2	3	"Material Girl" (Madonna)	Safe
Meliz Serman	Pair 2	4	"The Voice Within" (Christina Aguilera)	Bottom 2 (Lowest Votes)
Helena Blackman	Solo Performance	5	"Woman in Love" (Barbra Streisand)	Safe
Connie Fisher	Pair 3	6	"Shout" (The Isley Brothers)	Safe
Leanne Dobinson	Pair 3	7	"See the Day" (Dee C. Lee)	Safe
Siobhan Dillon	Pair 4	8	"Chains" (Tina Arena)	Safe
Aoife Mulholland	Pair 4	9	"If My Friends Could See Me Now" (from Sweet Charity)	Safe

- Guest performance: "You Can't Stop a River" (Duncan James)

Sing-Off

Act	Sing Off Song	Results
Belinda Evans	"Another Suitcase in Another Hall" from Evita	Eliminated
Meliz Serman	"Another Suitcase in Another Hall" from Evita	Saved by Lloyd Webber

=== Week 3 ===
During the week, David Ian talked to the girls about fitness and stamina, and Claire Sweeney advised the singers on looking after themselves and their voices. The mission was a fitness test, with Olympic athlete Iwan Thomas, requiring the Marias to complete an assault course. The Marias also attended the première of the film You, Me and Dupree in Leicester Square.

The show performances were:

- Group performances:
  - "The Lonely Goatherd" (from The Sound of Music)
  - "Don't Stop Me Now" (Queen)

Contestants' performances on the third live show
Act	Performance Pair	Order	Song	Result
Siobhan Dillon	Pair 1	1	"Jump (for My Love)" (The Pointer Sisters)	Safe
Leanne Dobinson	Pair 1	2	"9 to 5" (Dolly Parton)	Safe
Helena Blackman	Pair 2	3	"Flashdance... What a Feeling" (Irene Cara)	Bottom 2
Aoife Mulholland	Pair 2	4	"Sway" (Dean Martin)	Safe
Meliz Serman	Pair 3	5	"Girls Just Want to Have Fun" (Cyndi Lauper)	Bottom 2 (Lowest Votes)
Abi Finley	Pair 3	6	"Big Spender" (from Sweet Charity)	Safe
Connie Fisher	Pair 4	7	"My Baby Just Cares for Me" (Nina Simone)	Safe
Simona Armstrong	Pair 4	8	"I Only Want to Be with You" (Dusty Springfield)	Safe

- Guest performance: "Something About You" (Jamelia)
- Panel's verdict on who was Maria
  - John Barrowman: Aoife
  - Zoe Tyler: Abi
  - David Ian: Abi

Sing-Off

Act	Sing Off Song	Results
Helena Blackman	"Take That Look Off Your Face" from Tell Me on a Sunday	Saved by Lloyd Webber
Meliz Serman	"Take That Look Off Your Face" from Tell Me on a Sunday	Eliminated

=== Week 4 ===
Ahead of Saturday night, Lloyd Webber made a surprise visit to the contestants and worked with each to improve their performance. Lloyd Webber also watched them on how well they interact with kids.

The show performances were:

- Group performances:
  - "Do-Re-Mi" (from The Sound of Music)

Contestants' performances on the fourth live show
Act	Order	Song	Results Part 1	Results Part 2
Helena Blackman	1	"Can You Feel the Love Tonight" (Elton John)	Bottom 2	Bottom 2 (Lowest Votes)
Connie Fisher	2	"Diamonds Are a Girl's Best Friend" (from Gentlemen Prefer Blondes)	Safe	Safe
Abi Finley	3	"Summertime" (from Porgy and Bess)	Safe	Safe
Leanne Dobinson	4	"Hopelessly Devoted to You" (Olivia Newton-John)	Safe	Bottom 2
Aoife Mulholland	5	"You'll Never Walk Alone" (from Carousel)	Safe	Safe
Simona Armstrong	6	"It's My Turn" (Diana Ross)	Bottom 2 (Lowest Votes)	N/A
Siobhan Dillon	7	"Songbird" (Fleetwood Mac)	Safe	Safe

- Guest performance: "It's Not That Easy" (Lemar)
- Panel's verdict on who was Maria
  - John Barrowman: Helena
  - Zoe Tyler: Siobhan
  - David Ian: Siobhan

First sing-off:

Act	Sing Off Song	Results
Helena Blackman	"Memory" from Cats	Saved by Lloyd Webber
Simona Armstrong	"Memory" from Cats	Eliminated

- Performance with children: Siobhan: "Truly Scrumptious" from Chitty Chitty Bang Bang

Second sing-off:

Act	Sing Off Song	Results
Helena Blackman	"I Don't Know How to Love Him" from Jesus Christ Superstar	Saved by Lloyd Webber
Leanne Dobinson	"I Don't Know How to Love Him" from Jesus Christ Superstar	Eliminated

=== Week 5 ===
This week, the mission was a chemistry test with John Barrowman, which involved his giving the Marias a surprise kiss.

The show performances were:

- Group performances:
  - "I Have Confidence" (from The Sound of Music)
  - With John Barrowman: "Have You Met Miss Jones?" (from I'd Rather Be Right)

Contestants' performances on the fifth live show
Act	Order	Song	Results Part 1	Results Part 2
Connie Fisher	1	"If I Can't Have You" (Yvonne Elliman)	Safe	Safe
Siobhan Dillon	2	"All That Jazz" (from Chicago)	Safe	Bottom 2
Helena Blackman	3	"My Heart Will Go On" (Celine Dion)	Safe	Safe
Abi Finley	4	"Maybe This Time" (Liza Minnelli)	Bottom 2 (Lowest Votes)	N/A
Aoife Mulholland	5	"Footloose" (from Footloose)	Bottom 2	Bottom 2 (Lowest Votes)

- Guest performance: "Oh What a Girl" (Simply Red)
- Panel's verdict on who was Maria
  - John Barrowman: Connie
  - Zoe Tyler: Helena
  - David Ian: Connie

First sing-off:

Act	Sing Off Song	Results
Abi Finley	"Any Dream Will Do" from Joseph and the Amazing Technicolor Dreamcoat	Eliminated
Aoife Mulholland	"Any Dream Will Do" from Joseph and the Amazing Technicolor Dreamcoat	Saved by Lloyd Webber

Second sing Off

Act	Sing Off Song	Results
Siobhan Dillon	"Don't Cry for Me Argentina" from Evita	Saved by Lloyd Webber
Aoife Mulholland	"Don't Cry for Me Argentina" from Evita	Eliminated

=== Week 6 ===
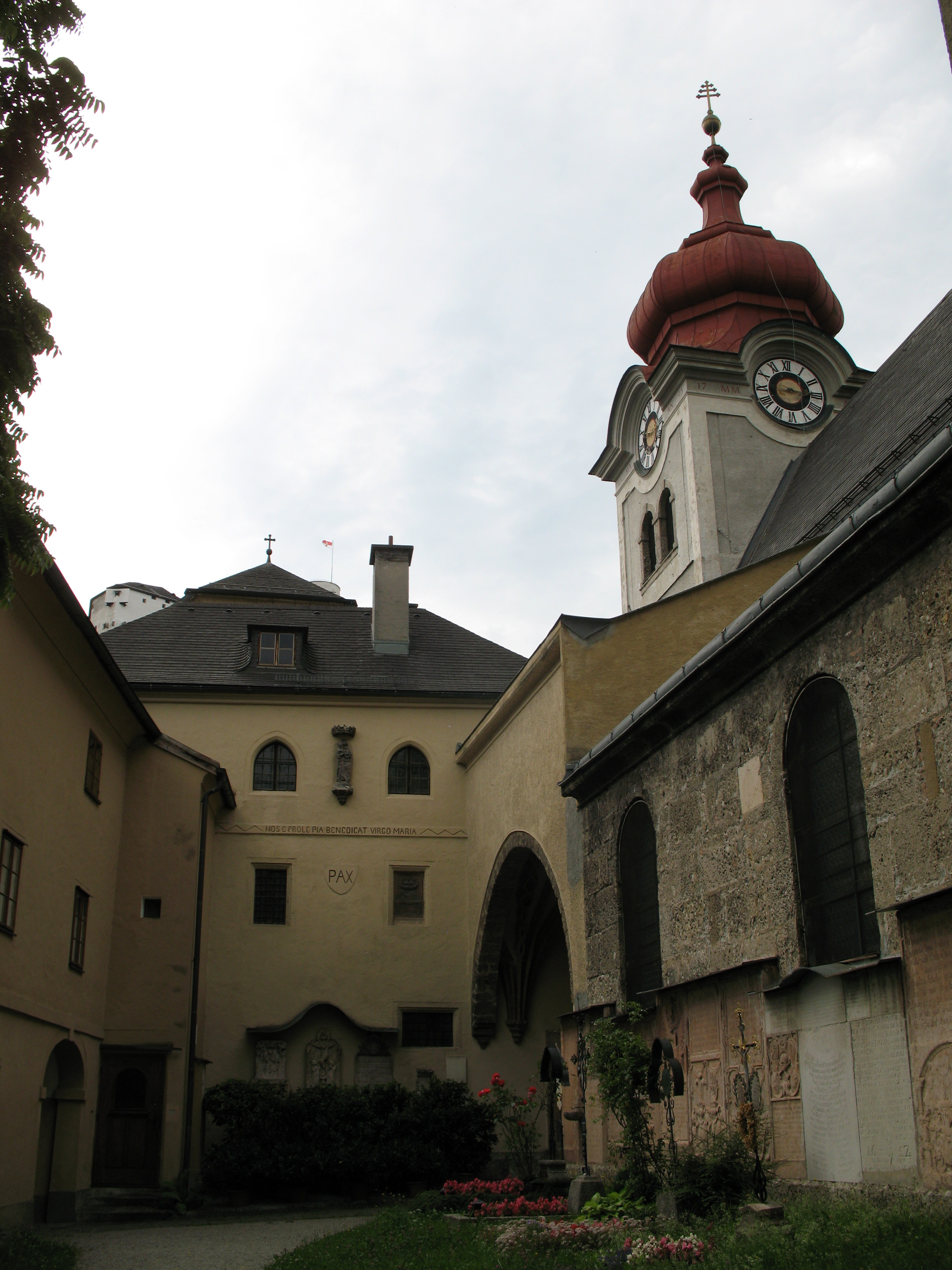
Lloyd Webber and the three finalists visited Nonnberg Abbey during a trip to Salzburg ahead of the final

In the run-up to the final, the three finalists and Lloyd Webber visited Salzburg to visit some of the locations made famous by The Sound of Music, including Leopoldskron Palace and Nonnberg Abbey, to give the finalists a chance to understand the real Maria von Trapp.

- Group performance:
  - Finalists and former Marias: "How Do You Solve a Problem Like Maria?" (from The Sound of Music)
  - Connie and Helena: "The Sound of Music" (from The Sound of Music)
  - Former Marias: "Edelweiss" (from The Sound of Music)

Contestants' performances on the sixth live show
Act	Order	Song	Order	The Sound of Music song	Order	Song of the Series	Result
Siobhan Dillon	1	"Anyone Who Had a Heart" (Cilla Black)	4	"My Favorite Things"	N/A	N/A (already eliminated)	3rd Place (Eliminated)
Helena Blackman	2	"Cabaret" (from Cabaret)	5	"Do-Re-Mi"	7	"Woman in Love"	Runner-up
Connie Fisher	3	"As Long as He Needs Me" (from Oliver!)	6	"The Lonely Goatherd"	8	"Shout"	Winner

- Panel's verdict on who was Maria
  - John Barrowman: Connie
  - Zoe Tyler: Helena
  - David Ian: Connie
  - Andrew Lloyd Webber: Connie
- After being announced as the series winner, Connie concluded the series with a performance of "The Sound of Music".

== Winner ==
Following a public telephone vote, 23-year-old Connie Fisher was chosen as Maria and performed the role in the West End from November 2006 to February 2008. The series also helped the careers of the other finalists, some of whom later took leading roles in West End shows. Semi-finalist Aoife Mulholland also took up the role of Maria in April 2007 for two shows a week, after Fisher was advised to reduce her performances to six per week.

== After the series ==
Following the final, Lloyd Webber was criticised after it was revealed that actress Emma Williams had been hired to perform the two performances per week that Fisher would not. Prior to The Sound of Music opening Williams "withdrew her services", reportedly because her role had been downgraded from four shows per week to two, leaving Fisher to perform all eight shows unless indisposed.

The £4 million production opened at the London Palladium on 15 November 2006 to positive reviews, leading to a £1.1 million increase in ticket sales in one day. In January 2007, Fisher was chosen by the London Critics' Circle to win their award for best newcomer, sharing the prize with Andrew Garfield. Reducing her performances to six per week in March 2007 following an order to rest her voice, her run in the show was extended until 23 February 2008, when actress Summer Strallen took over the role following a tie-in with the Channel 4 soap Hollyoaks. Fisher has also made numerous appearances on stage and on television, released two albums, and performed the lead role in the ITV1 drama Caught in a Trap on 26 December 2008. She reprised her role as Maria in a UK tour of the production in July 2009.

Several of the other final ten contestants have taken on leading roles in musicals following the series. Aoife Mulholland was cast in December 2006 as Roxie Hart in the West End musical Chicago, and took on the role of Maria in the West End production for two shows per week in April 2007 after Fisher's reduction in performances. In July 2007 Siobhan Dillon started in the role of Patty Simcox in the musical Grease and later went on to play the lead role of Sandy in January 2010. Fellow finalist Helena Blackman played Nellie Forbush in a UK tour of South Pacific. Mulholland originated the role of Brooke Wyndham in the West End production of Legally Blonde, and Dillon took over the role of Vivienne Kensington in October 2010. In June 2008, Leanne Dobinson took over in the role of Cosette in the West End cast of Les Misérables at the Queens Theatre.

A follow-up programme How Do You Solve a Problem Like Maria? – Connie's Story aired on 27 December 2006 and followed Fisher during rehearsals for her new role up to and including the opening night. Fisher and several other finalists appeared in a special programme on 24 December 2007 with the winner and finalists from Any Dream Will Do titled When Joseph Met Maria.

== Reception ==
Lloyd Webber and the BBC were criticised by the actors union Equity. They stated that they believed their members would find the series "demeaning to their profession" and that it was not a "proper way" to choose a performer.

The series opened to mostly negative reviews from the press. In response to the criticism, Lloyd Webber told The Times:

This programme is providing a platform for musical theatre that it has never had before. The only people upset with Maria are a few precious luvvies who think things should be done a certain way.

Lloyd Webber and the BBC were also criticised for giving the production "11 hours of free publicity on prime-time television" and that the series could be "considered commercial advertising". The BBC Trust's Editorial Standards Committee disagreed, saying that the corporation retained "editorial control of the programme" and avoided "disproportionate prominence for Lloyd Webber and the production".

The first programme attracted 5.1 million viewers with a 32% audience share, with 4.9 million viewers (30% share) watching the first of the live finals, and 4.7 million (23% share) viewing the results programme. The series dropped to a low of 4.4 million viewers (24% share) against the third series of The X Factor on ITV1, which started the week before. The X Factor continued to gain higher viewing figures as the weeks progressed, with the final of Maria? attracting 5.5 million viewers (28% share) for the main show and 7.7 million (35% share) for the results show.

Following the conclusion of the series on a ratings high and positive reviews for Fisher following her opening night, the series was followed by a number of similar series from both the BBC and other broadcasters in the UK and abroad. It was credited with helping London theatres reach record ticket sales and attendances in 2007 and, according to The Independent, for "persuading a new, younger audience to see the shows in the flesh".

The series was shown on BBC America in the United States from June 2009. It was described as being "refreshing in its simplicity" in a "landscape that lately seems dominated by audition-heavy musical competitions" by Los Angeles Times critic Mary McNamara, but Brian Lowry of Variety did not feel that it would be successful in the U.S.

=== Awards ===
The series won three awards, and received nominations for another two:

- 2007 International Emmy Awards: winner – non-scripted entertainment
- 2006 Royal Television Society Awards: winner – best entertainment programme
- 2007 Broadcast Awards: winner – best entertainment programme
- 2007 British Academy Television Awards: nominated – best entertainment programme
- 2007 Broadcasting Press Guild Awards: nominated – best comedy/entertainment

== Ratings ==
Episode	Airdate	Viewers (millions)	BBC One weekly ranking	Share
Auditions 1	29 July 2006	5.15	14	32.0%
Auditions 2	5 August 2006	4.69	18	31.0%
Results	5 August 2006	5.20	13	27.0%
Live Show 1	12 August 2006	5.07	14	30.0%
Results 1	12 August 2006	4.80	15	23.0%
Live Show 2	19 August 2006	4.47	18	23.0%
Results 2	19 August 2006	5.35	15	—N/a
Live Show 3	26 August 2006	4.45	18	23.7%
Results 3	26 August 2006	5.67	11	27.8%
Live Show 4	2 September 2006	5.36	13	24.0%
Results 4	2 September 2006	5.92	10	26.0%
Live Show 5	9 September 2006	4.76	17	24.4%
Results 5	9 September 2006	6.40	10	30.0%
Live Final	16 September 2006	5.82	12	28.3%
Final Results	16 September 2006	8.20	4	35.0%
Average		5.42	—N/a	27.5%

== Follow-up and international series ==
The success of the series led to its becoming the first in a series of West End themed talent contests produced by the BBC in collaboration with Lloyd Webber. 2007 saw Any Dream Will Do search for a new male lead to play Joseph for a production of Lloyd Webber's and Tim Rice's Joseph and the Amazing Technicolor Dreamcoat. This was followed in 2008 by I'd Do Anything, which sought a lead to play Nancy and three young performers to play the lead in a production of the musical Oliver!. In 2010, Over the Rainbow cast Dorothy and a dog to play Toto in the forthcoming stage production of the 1939 film The Wizard of Oz. The BBC also collaborated with Lloyd Webber to find a performer for Britain's entry into the Eurovision Song Contest 2009 through Eurovision: Your Country Needs You.

On 20 August 2006, it was reported that Lloyd Webber had taken legal action against David Ian. Lloyd Webber reportedly wanted to take the format to the United States to cast a Broadway theatre production of Grease. Lloyd Webber discovered that Ian had already brought the idea to NBC, who announced they will look for unknowns to play Sandy Dumbrowski and Danny Zuko, via reality TV show Grease: You're the One that I Want! with Ian and BBC Worldwide, leaving Lloyd Webber furious. Ian said "I don't understand the problem. Andrew has no connection with the stage show Grease, which I have successfully produced in the UK. There is a new production of Grease on Broadway in the spring of 2007, that's why I've been asked to judge on You're The One That We Want." This was followed in the UK with the ITV1 series Grease Is the Word, with Ian as a judge. It aired against Any Dream Will Do in 2007.

Op zoek naar Evita (Looking for Evita) was produced in The Netherlands in 2007, followed by Op zoek naar Joseph (Looking for Joseph) in 2008, Op zoek naar Mary Poppins (Looking for Mary Poppins) in 2009, Op zoek naar Zorro (Looking for Zorro) in 2011, Op zoek naar Annie (Looking for Annie) in 2012 and most recently Op zoek naar Maria (Looking for Maria) in 2021 and Op zoek naar Danny & Sandy (Looking for Danny & Sandy) in 2022.

In 2008 a Canadian version of the show with the same title, searched for a Maria for an upcoming Toronto production of The Sound of Music; this show was initiated by Lloyd Webber, and was aired on CBC Television. John Barrowman was part of the judging panel along with Simon Lee and Canadian vocal coach Elaine Overholt. Lloyd Webber filled in for Lee in the final weeks of the series. This was followed by Over the Rainbow in 2012, with Lloyd Webber serving as a judge.

In 2009 Vtm aired a Flemish version titled Op zoek naar Maria (Looking for Maria). A Dutch version of Op zoek naar Maria came out in 2021.
