= Siobhan Dillon =

English actress and singer (born 1984)

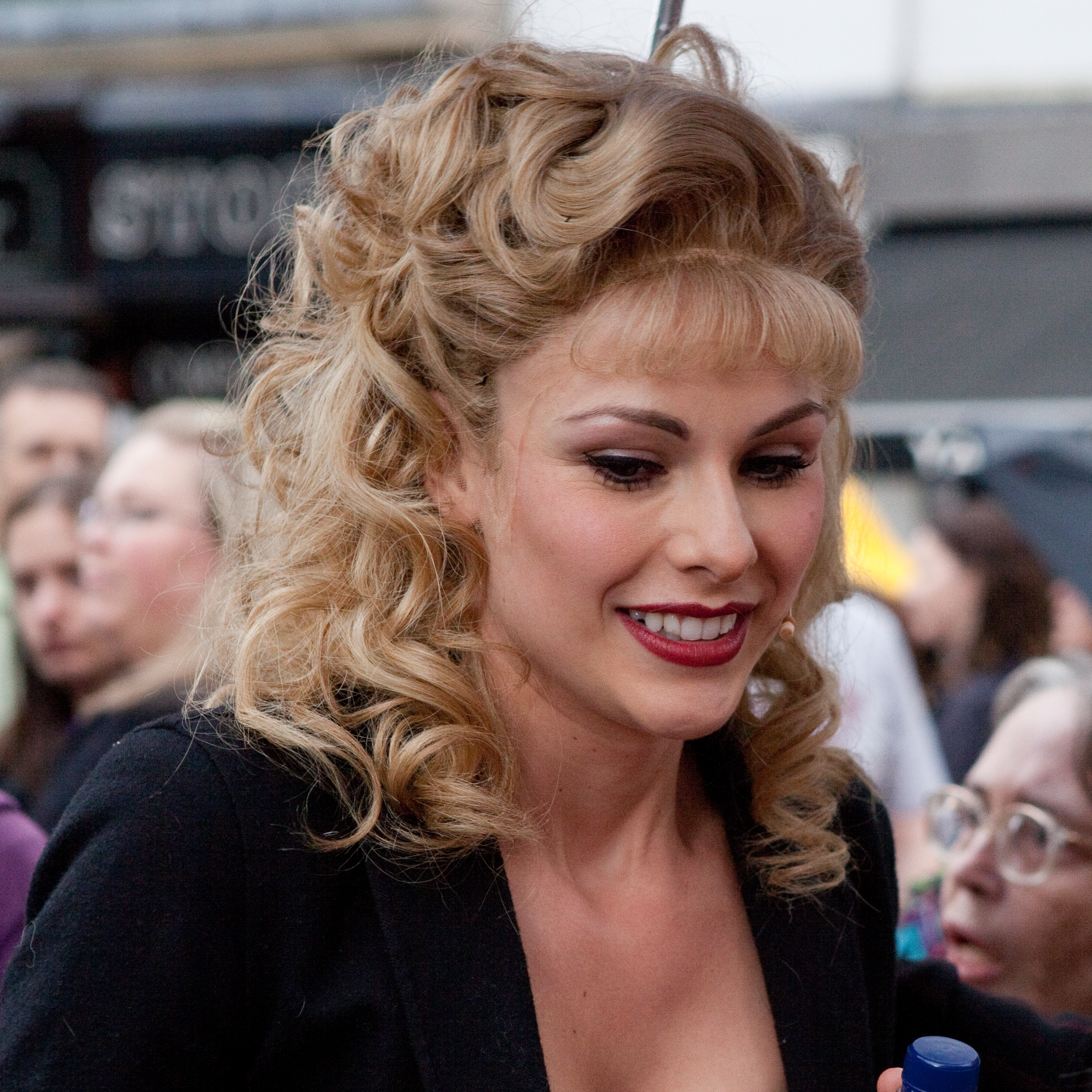
- Siobhan Dillon, following her performance as Sandy from the musical Grease, at West End Live 2010.

Background information
- Born: Siobhan Patricia Dillon; 1 September 1984 (age 41); Lichfield, Staffordshire, England
- Genres: Pop, musicals
- Occupations: Singer, actress
- Years active: 2006–present

Siobhan Patricia Dillon (born 1 September 1984) is an English actress and singer, who rose to fame when she performed in the British talent show-themed television series How Do You Solve a Problem Like Maria? on BBC One in 2006. Since then, Dillon has performed in the West End, playing the roles of Sandy in Grease at the Piccadilly Theatre, Vivienne Kensington in Legally Blonde at the Savoy Theatre, Sally Bowles in Cabaret, Molly in Ghost the Musical at the Piccadilly Theatre, Ellen in Miss Saigon, and Betty Schaefer in Sunset Boulevard with the English National Opera. Siobhan reprised this role at the Palace Theatre in New York City.

== Background ==
Dillon's mother owned her own business in advertising after being a drama teacher. Her father is Irish from Dún Laoghaire. For her ninth birthday Dillon asked her parents for singing lessons, and had vocal training with singing teacher Richard Paul up to the age of 16. Siobhan attended The Friary School in Lichfield where she performed in shows, but as she did not think she would become a singer, she turned to the fashion world. She was a member of Lichfield Operatic Society and in October 2001 performed the title song from the musical Whistle Down the Wind as part of the society's show, Whistle Down the West End at The Friary School Theatre in Lichfield. After Michael Parkinson heard a tape of her singing, he asked her to sing at his charity cricket ball in 2003, where she got a standing ovation. Prior to appearing on How Do You Solve a Problem Like Maria? Dillon was in the middle of a BA Hons degree in Product Design and Development for the Fashion Industry, Accessories pathway at Cordwainers College, University of the Arts London.

== Career ==
=== How Do You Solve A Problem Like Maria? ===
Dillon was 21 years old when she appeared on the BBC television show, How Do You Solve A Problem Like Maria?. She reached the final of the show and finished in third place behind Helena Blackman and winner Connie Fisher. Despite being one of the favourites during the first round of auditions, Dillon initially did not make the final ten after an illness had affected her vocals during the final stages. However, after finalist Emilie Alford dropped out of the competition, Dillon, being the last person eliminated during the selection process returned to the show and was given the nickname, "Second Chance Maria".

In week one of the live shows Dillon sang the Shania Twain hit, "Man! I Feel Like a Woman!". In week two she sang the Tina Arena song, "Chains". In the lead up to the third week's show, David Ian talked to the girls about fitness and stamina and sent them on a fitness test mission with Olympic track and field athlete Iwan Thomas, requiring the Marias to complete an assault course. Dillon completed the course in the fastest time of under two minutes. On the show she sang the Pointer Sisters hit, "Jump!". Zoe Tyler then asked her to sing the final lines from her audition piece, "I Could Have Danced All Night".

In week four she sang "Songbird" by Christine McVie, which resulted in her being named the unofficial "Maria of the night". Andrew Lloyd Webber chose her to perform "Truly Scrumptious" with the children from the musical Chitty Chitty Bang Bang. In the fifth week, when there were two live shows, she sang "All That Jazz" from the musical Chicago accompanied by six male dancers. Dillon successfully got through to the second live show of the evening but faced the second sing off with Aoife Mulholland. They sang "Don't Cry for Me, Argentina" from the musical Evita. Lloyd Webber saved Dillon because he believed she "had the strongest voice which could carry eight shows a week".

In the run-up to the final in week six, the three finalists and Lloyd Webber went to Salzburg in Austria and visited some of the locations made famous by The Sound of Music, including Leopoldskron Palace and Nonnberg Abbey, to give the finalists a chance to understand the real Maria von Trapp. On the final night she performed two songs, "Anyone Who Had a Heart" and "My Favorite Things" from The Sound of Music. She was eliminated during the night's first public vote, which meant she came third overall.

==== Performances on How Do You Solve a Problem Like Maria? ====
- Please note this is a list of her individual performances only

Show	Song
Week one	"Man! I Feel Like a Woman!"
Week two	"Chains"
Week three	"Jump"
Week four	"Songbird" "Truly Scrumptious"
Week five	"All That Jazz"
Week six (final)	"Anyone Who Had a Heart" "My Favourite Things" from The Sound of Music

=== Grease ===
Dillon made her West End theatre debut in 2007 playing Patty Simcox in the musical Grease. Her first appearance in the show was on 25 July 2007 at the Piccadilly Theatre in London. Show producer, David Ian said of Dillon, "I knew that Siobhan was something special when I first saw her for The Sound of Music, and I am very pleased that she will be joining the cast of Grease." On 16 November she performed on the BBC's Children in Need 2007 live broadcast as part of the cast of Grease.

Dillon was also the understudy for the characters of Sandy and Marty and played both roles several times during her run in the show. She finished the role on 14 June 2008.

Dillon returned to the production on 25 January 2010 this time taking over the lead role of Sandy from Emma Stevens. She played her final performance on 24 July 2010 and was succeeded by Over the Rainbow contestant Lauren Samuels.

=== Can't Smile Without You ===
In July 2008 she was cast in the tour of Can't Smile Without You, a new musical based on an original idea by Bill Kenwright and featuring the hit songs of Barry Manilow, alongside Chesney Hawkes and I'd Do Anything contestant Francesca Jackson. It opened at the Churchill Theatre, in the London Borough of Bromley on 28 August 2008 and toured in England and Scotland until 29 November.

=== Other work ===
Dillon won a record deal with Andrew Lloyd Webber’s company the Really Useful Group (RUG) after How Do You Solve a Problem Like Maria?. She is said to be writing and recording her first album, although on her Myspace page she is quoted saying, that after Andrew Lloyd Webber announced during one of the live How Do You Solve a Problem Like Maria? shows that "a major record label" were interested in working with her, she started writing songs for her album and worked with producers and writers but that "due to unfortunate circumstances the album was never released..."

On Christmas Eve 2007 she performed along with Lee Mead the winner of Any Dream Will Do and Connie Fisher together with other 'Maria' and 'Joseph' finalists in the BBC special festive reunion show "When Joseph Met Maria" celebrating both the hit Andrew Lloyd Webber BBC shows.

From late 2009 Dillon took over the role of Sally Bowles in the UK tour of Cabaret from former I'd Do Anything contestant Samantha Barks.

Dillon took over the part of Vivienne Kensington from Caroline Keiff in the West End production of Legally Blonde on 25 October 2010. She therefore became the second How Do You Solve A Problem Like Maria? finalist to star in the musical, as fellow ex-contestant Aoife Mulholland was playing Brooke Wyndham at the time she took the role.

Beginning performance 13 January 2012, Dillon replaced Caissie Levy in the lead role of Molly Jensen in Ghost the Musical at the Piccadilly Theatre in London's West End. She commented about her new role in a London theatre interview. The official press night for the new cast took place 28 February. Dillon and co-star Mark Evans (who plays Sam Wheat) appeared on Live With Gabby on 7 March 2012. In June 2012, it was announced that Ghost was to give its final curtain on 6 October 2012. It shuttered that day, with Dillon closing out the show as Molly.

In 2013, she reprised her role as Sally Bowles in the revised UK tour of Cabaret, starring alongside Matt Rawle and Will Young.

On 11 May 2015, Dillon took over the role of Ellen in the West End revival of Miss Saigon.

Dillon played the role of Betty Schaefer in Sunset Boulevard at the London Coliseum, which opened on 4 April 2016. She made her Broadway debut in the musical's Broadway revival on 9 February 2017 at the Palace Theatre.

Dillon's debut solo album, One Voice, was released in April 2020. One of the tracks on the album, She Used To Be Mine, was released on her website several years prior following her breast cancer in 2015.
