= When Joseph Met Maria =

Television programme

- Genre: Music special
- Presented by: Graham Norton
- Judges: Andrew Lloyd Webber; John Barrowman; Denise Van Outen; Bill Kenwright; Zoe Tyler
- Country of origin: United Kingdom
- Original language: English
- No. of episodes: 1

Production
- Running time: 60 minutes

Original release
- Network: BBC One
- Release: 24 December 2007

Related
- How Do You Solve A Problem Like Maria? Any Dream Will Do

When Joseph Met Maria was a television Christmas special featuring several 'Maria' and 'Joseph' finalists from Andrew Lloyd Webber's BBC talent searches How Do You Solve A Problem Like Maria? (2006) and Any Dream Will Do (2007), including winners Connie Fisher and Lee Mead. It was aired on BBC One on 24 December 2007 and was presented by Graham Norton.

When Joseph Met Maria showed what several of the finalists were up to since taking part in the live shows. It also featured several performances from the selected finalists, as well as judges John Barrowman, who performed with the Marias, and Denise Van Outen, who performed with the Josephs. Also present were judges Bill Kenwright and Zoe Tyler.

== Finalists ==
The finalists from each series present were:

Marias

Contestant	Overall position
Connie Fisher	1st
Helena Blackman	2nd
Siobhan Dillon	3rd
Aoife Mulholland	4th
Abi Finley	5th
Simona Armstrong	7th

Josephs

Contestant	Overall position
Lee Mead	1st
Keith Jack	2nd
Lewis Bradley	3rd
Craig Chalmers	5th
Daniel Boys	6th
Rob McVeigh	7th

== Songs ==
Song	Performed by
The Sound of Music/How Do You Solve a Problem Like Maria?	Connie Fisher and the Marias
Any Dream Will Do/Go, Go, Go Joseph	Lee Mead and the Josephs
Shout	Connie Fisher and the Marias
The Boys Are Back in Town	Lee Mead and the Josephs
All I Want for Christmas Is You	The Marias
Santa Claus is Coming to Town	The Josephs
The Perfect Year	Connie Fisher
If I Can Dream	Lee Mead
Baby, It's Cold Outside	John Barrowman and the Marias
Santa Baby	Denise Van Outen and the Josephs
All I Ask of You	Connie Fisher and Lee Mead
White Christmas	All (including Andrew Lloyd Webber, Zoe Tyler and Bill Kenwright)

== Kerst Met Joseph en Evita ==
A similar special, entitled Kerst Met Joseph en Evita (Christmas with Joseph and Evita) was aired on Christmas Eve 2008, uniting several 'Evita' and 'Joseph' finalists from the Dutch versions, Op zoek naar Evita and Op zoek naar Joseph including winners Brigitte Heitzer and Freek Bartels.
