= Lauren McConnell =

Lauren McConnell may refer to:

- Lauren McConnell (performer) on Grease Is the Word
- Loren McConnell, fictional character
