= Any Dream Will Do (TV series) =

British television series

- Created by: Andrew Lloyd Webber; Bea Ballard
- Presented by: Graham Norton
- Judges: Andrew Lloyd Webber; John Barrowman; Denise van Outen; Bill Kenwright; Zoë Tyler
- Country of origin: United Kingdom
- No. of series: 1
- No. of episodes: 11

Production
- Producer: BBC Entertainment
- Running time: 30–90mins

Original release
- Network: BBC One, BBC HD
- Release: 31 March – 9 June 2007

Any Dream Will Do, was a 2007 talent show-themed television series produced by the BBC in the United Kingdom. It searched for a new, unknown lead to play Joseph in a West End revival of the Andrew Lloyd Webber musical Joseph and the Amazing Technicolor Dreamcoat.

The show was hosted by Graham Norton, who announced Lee Mead as the winner of the final public telephone vote on 9 June 2007.

It was the second West-End talent show to be produced by the BBC/Andrew Lloyd Webber, after How Do You Solve a Problem like Maria?. Further talent shows in the series have aired, with I'd Do Anything running in 2008 and Over the Rainbow which ran in April/May 2010.

Lloyd Webber, Zoë Tyler & John Barrowman returned as panelists and Graham Norton returned to host the show.

A similar format has been used as well in The Netherlands in 2008, with the show Op zoek naar Joseph (Looking for Joseph) taking an unknown singer and placing the winner in the lead role for the 2009 performances in The Netherlands. On 26 October 2008, Freek Bartels was announced the winner of the show.

== Format ==
Commissioned after the success of the similar BBC series How Do You Solve A Problem Like Maria?, the series followed the same format to find a new, unknown lead for a revival of Joseph and the Amazing Technicolor Dreamcoat. The series was named after the song from the musical, "Any Dream Will Do".

=== Expert panel ===
David Ian did not appear on this show and was replaced by Bill Kenwright.

An expert panel provided advice to the contestants throughout the series, and provided comments during the live shows. As they appeared on screen from right to left, the panel was made up of:

- Zoë Tyler, vocal coach to the contestants (vocal coach, singer and performer)
- Bill Kenwright (theatre producer and co-producer of Joseph and the Amazing Technicolor Dreamcoat at the Adelphi Theatre)
- Denise Van Outen (musical theatre actress and television presenter) who later went on to date and marry winner Lee Mead.
- John Barrowman (musical theatre and television actor)
- Andrew Lloyd Webber, head judge and composer of Joseph. Presenter Graham Norton referred to him differently each week, mostly using variations of "Lord" phrases. When he was announced as part of the expert panel, the chandeliers behind him flashed and a few bars from The Phantom of the Opera rang out. Usually, Lloyd Webber showed mock embarrassment or surprise, while Barrowman and Van Outen feigned either fright or worship of him.

=== Auditions ===
The first week of the show documented the initial auditions where 100 hopefuls, from thousands, were called back to London. This was further whittled down by the panel of judges to 50 contestants who would enter Andrew Lloyd Webber's "Joseph School". However, two additional entrants were selected over this 50 contestant limit after they went to Lloyd Webber's personal studio for a second audition.

In the second week, the 52 individuals selected attended "Joseph School" where the coaches worked on singing, acting and choreography with the contestants. Former Joseph actor Jason Donovan, amongst others, visited to lend his advice and support for them. On the second day, one contestant left the competition, 23 were eliminated and only 28 remained. On the third day, another eight men were eliminated, leaving only 20 contestants in the competition. These men were taken to Lloyd Webber's castle in Ireland, where they performed live in front of a packed house of locals and industry professionals including Louis Walsh. The best 12 were then taken through to the live studio finals.

== Finalists ==
Graham Norton and the twelve contestants each wearing their 'dreamcoat', symbolically handed back once they were eliminated. Those pictured are (clockwise from top left) Chris B, Antony, Chris C, host Graham Norton, Keith, Lewis, Ben, Johndeep, Daniel, Seamus, Craig, Lee and Rob.

Twelve potential Josephs were chosen, each wearing a unique coloured coat. At the end of every live show, the Joseph who was eliminated had his coat stripped off whilst singing a song of farewell (a combination of "Poor, Poor Joseph" and "Close Every Door to Me").

Finalist	Age	From	Coat Colour	Status
Chris Crosby	18	Nottingham	Burgundy	Eliminated 1st in Week 1
Johndeep More	23	Birmingham	Lime green	Eliminated 2nd in Week 2
Antony Hansen	17	Abingdon, Oxon	Pastel blue	Eliminated 3rd in Week 3
Seamus Cullen	35	London	Green	Eliminated 4th in Week 3
Chris Barton	20	Ormskirk	Lilac	Eliminated 5th in Week 4
Robert "Rob" McVeigh	23	Rotherham	Turquoise	Eliminated 6th in Week 5
Daniel Boys	28	London	Purple	Eliminated 7th in Week 6
Craig Chalmers	25	Edinburgh	Dark blue	Eliminated 8th in Week 7
Ben Ellis	18	Scarborough	Orange	Eliminated 9th in Week 8
Lewis Bradley	17	Middlesbrough	Light blue	Eliminated 10th in Week 9
Keith Jack	19	Midlothian	Yellow	Runner-up
Lee Mead	25	Southend-on-Sea	Red	Winner

=== Results summary ===
Colour key

–	Contestant was in the bottom two and who was saved after the sing off
–	Contestant was eliminated after the sing off
–	Contestant who received the most public votes

Weekly results per contestant
Contestant	Week 1	Week 2	Week 3		Week 4	Week 5	Week 6	Week 7	Week 8	Final	
Contestant	Week 1	Week 2	Part 1	Part 2	Week 4	Week 5	Week 6	Week 7	Week 8	Part 1	Part 2
Lee Mead	2nd	1st	1st	1st	3rd	2nd	1st	1st	1st	1st	Winner (week 9)
Keith Jack	5th	3rd	3rd	2nd	1st	1st	3rd	2nd	2nd	2nd	Runner-up (week 9)
Lewis Bradley	4th	4th	4th	4th	5th	6th	5th	3rd	3rd	3rd	Eliminated (week 9)
Ben Ellis	11th	9th	7th	8th	6th	4th	2nd	5th	4th	Eliminated (week 8)	
Craig Chalmers	10th	7th	10th	6th	7th	3rd	4th	4th	Eliminated (week 7)		
Daniel Boys	1st	2nd	2nd	3rd	2nd	5th	6th	Eliminated (week 6)			
Rob McVeigh	7th	5th	5th	5th	4th	7th	Eliminated (week 5)				
Chris Barton	3rd	11th	6th	7th	8th	Eliminated (week 4)					
Seamus Cullen	6th	8th	8th	9th	Eliminated (week 3)						
Antony Hansen	8th	6th	9th	Eliminated (week 3)							
Johndeep More	9th	10th	Eliminated (week 2)								
Chris Crosby	12th	Eliminated (week 1)									

== Live shows ==
The 12 finalists, (or "Josephs"), were announced on 7 April 2007, with the live studio finals starting a week later. Each week the "Josephs" were set various singing and performing tasks. They were introduced with clips summarising their past week before performing a solo song and hearing comments from the panel. Each week they also performed two group songs, one from Joseph at the start of each show, and one after the solo performances. All the performances were live in front of a studio audience, with a live band headed by Nigel Wright and backing singers.

Every week, a Joseph was eliminated from the competition. The public got a chance to vote for their favourite Joseph by calling in after all the finalists' solo performances. The two Josephs with the fewest votes in a given week performed a sing-off in front of Lloyd Webber, who then decided which contestant to keep, based upon how well he felt that contender would fill the Joseph role. The eliminated Joseph then performed "Poor, Poor Joseph/Close Every Door" together with the remaining Josephs, as his grand exit song, symbolically handing back his dreamcoat.

=== Week 1 (14 April 2007) ===
- Theme-No1s
- Group performances:
  - "Any Dream Will Do"
  - "Luck Be a Lady" (from Guys and Dolls)

Contestants' performances on the first live show
Contestant	Performance Pair	Order	Song	Result
Rob McVeigh	Pair 1	1	"Summer of '69"	Safe
Lee Mead	Pair 1	2	"Mack the Knife"	Safe
Lewis Bradley	Pair 2	3	"Faith"	Safe
Ben Ellis	Pair 2	4	"Johnny B. Goode"	Bottom two
Craig Chalmers	Pair 3	5	"Try a Little Tenderness"	Safe
Johndeep More	Pair 3	6	"If There's Any Justice"	Safe
Seamus Cullen	Pair 4	7	"I Still Haven't Found What I'm Looking For"	Safe
Antony Hansen	Pair 4	8	"I Don't Want to Miss a Thing"	Safe
Chris Crosby	Pair 5	9	"This Love"	Bottom two
Daniel Boys	Pair 5	10	"You Give Me Something"	Safe
Chris Barton	Pair 6	11	"Walking in Memphis"	Safe
Keith Jack	Pair 6	12	"Crazy Little Thing Called Love"	Safe

- Panel's verdict on who was not Joseph
  - John Barrowman: Craig Chalmers
  - Denise Van Outen: Craig Chalmers
  - Bill Kenwright: Chris Crosby
  - Zoe Tyler: Antony Hansen

Sing-off:

Act	Sing Off Song	Results
Ben Ellis	"Bridge over Troubled Water"	Saved by Lloyd Webber
Chris Crosby	"Bridge over Troubled Water"	Eliminated

=== Week 2 (21 April 2007) ===
- Theme: Pop Classics
- Group performances:
  - "Jacob & Sons/Joseph's Coat"
  - "Pinball Wizard" (The Who)
- Mission:
  - Coming on stage at a McFly concert

Contestants' performances on the second live show
Contestant	Performance Pair	Order	Song	Result
Daniel Boys	Pair 1	1	"Since U Been Gone"	Safe
Craig Chalmers	Pair 1	2	"Home"	Safe
Keith Jack	Pair 2	3	"Who Am I"	Safe
Seamus Cullen	Pair 2	4	"Being Alive"	Safe
Ben Ellis	Solo Performance	5	"All by Myself"	Safe
Johndeep More	Pair 3	6	"Something's Coming"	Bottom two
Chris Barton	Pair 3	7	"I'll Be There"	Bottom two
Rob McVeigh	Pair 4	8	"Piano Man"	Safe
Antony Hansen	Pair 4	9	"Light My Fire"	Safe
Lewis Bradley	Pair 5	10	"Sorry Seems to be the Hardest Word"	Safe
Lee Mead	Pair 5	11	"Bad Day"	Safe

- Panel's verdict on who was not Joseph
  - John Barrowman: Johndeep More
  - Denise Van Outen: Ben Ellis
  - Bill Kenwright: Johndeep More
  - Zoe Tyler: Ben Ellis

Sing-off:

Act	Sing Off Song	Results
Johndeep Moore	"Let It Be".	Eliminated
Chris Barton	"Let It Be".	Saved by Lloyd Webber

=== Week 3 (28 April 2007) ===
In a double elimination, two Josephs were voted off the series.

- Theme-Mixed Music
- Group performances:
  - "Go, Go, Go Joseph"
  - "One Vision" (Queen)
- Mission:
  - Singing "Pharaoh's Dream Explained" from Joseph and the Amazing Technicolor Dreamcoat to their mothers in a loin cloth.

Contestants' performances on the third live show
Contestant	Performance Pair	Order	Song	Results Part 1	Results Part 2
Seamus Cullen	Pair 1	1	"Start Me Up"	Safe	Bottom two
Lewis Bradley	Pair 1	2	"I Saw Her Standing There"	Safe	Safe
Rob McVeigh	Pair 2	3	"Oh, Pretty Woman"	Safe	Safe
Antony Hansen	Pair 2	4	"Patience"	Bottom two	—N/a
Chris Barton	Pair 3	5	"Tell Her About It"	Safe	Safe
Ben Ellis	Pair 3	6	"Life Is a Rollercoaster"	Safe	Bottom two
Daniel Boys	Pair 4	7	"The Lady Is a Tramp"	Safe	Safe
Lee Mead	Pair 4	8	"I Don't Want to Talk About It"	Safe	Safe
Keith Jack	Pair 5	9	"Crocodile Rock"	Safe	Safe
Craig Chalmers	Pair 5	10	"Signed, Sealed, Delivered I'm Yours"	Bottom two	Safe

- Panel's verdict on who was Joseph
  - John Barrowman: Daniel Boys
  - Denise Van Outen: Daniel Boys
  - Bill Kenwright: Lee Mead
  - Zoe Tyler: Keith Jack

Sing-off 1:

Act	Sing Off Song	Results
Antony Hansen	"(Everything I Do) I Do It for You"	Eliminated
Craig Chalmers	"(Everything I Do) I Do It for You"	Saved by Lloyd Webber

- Panel's verdict on who was not Joseph
  - John Barrowman: Rob McVeigh
  - Denise Van Outen: Chris Barton
  - Bill Kenwright: Rob McVeigh
  - Zoe Tyler: Craig Chalmers

Sing-off 2:

Act	Sing Off Song	Results
Seamus Cullen	"He Ain't Heavy, He's My Brother"	Eliminated
Ben Ellis	"He Ain't Heavy, He's My Brother"	Saved by Lloyd Webber

Notes:

- Upon being asked whether he was surprised that he was being sent home, Seamus said: "The words 'conspiracy theory' are going through my head" (Although he later implied he may have been joking). Then, during his farewell song, he changed the line "I have been promised a land of my own" to "I have been promised a show of my own."

=== Week 4 (5 May 2007) ===
- Theme-Decades
- Group performances:
  - "Song of the King"
  - "Dead Ringer For Love" (Meat Loaf)
- Mission:
  - Climbing the barricade and singing "Do You Hear The People Sing" from the musical Les Misérables

Contestants' performances on the fourth live show
Contestant	Performance Pair	Order	Song	Decade	Results
Ben Ellis	Pair 1	1	"Addicted to Love"	1980s	Safe
Craig Chalmers	Pair 1	2	"December, 1963 (Oh, What a Night)"	1970s	Bottom two
Lee Mead	Pair 2	3	"All Right Now"	1970s	Safe
Keith Jack	Pair 2	4	"Love Is All Around"	1960s	Safe
Lewis Bradley	Pair 3	5	"Dancing in the Moonlight"	2000s	Safe
Rob McVeigh	Pair 3	6	"Back for Good"	1990s	Safe
Chris Barton	Pair 4	7	"All Night Long"	1980s	Bottom two
Daniel Boys	Pair 4	8	"All About You"	2000s	Safe

- Panel's verdict on who was not Joseph
  - John Barrowman: Lewis Bradley
  - Denise Van Outen: Rob McVeigh
  - Bill Kenwright: Chris Barton Or Rob McVeigh
  - Zoe Tyler: Lee Mead

Sing-off:

Act	Sing Off Song	Results
Craig Chalmers	"The Long and Winding Road"	Saved by Lloyd Webber
Chris Barton	"The Long and Winding Road"	Eliminated

Notes:

- Prior to the farewell song, Graham Norton asked Chris who he thought was going to win the competition; Chris chose Lewis.

=== Week 5 (12 May 2007) ===
- Group performances:
  - "One More Angel in Heaven"
  - "You Really Got Me" (The Kinks)
- Mission:
  - Practising being aggressive with John Barrowman

Contestants' performances on the fifth live show
Contestant	Performance Pair	Order	Song	Results
Rob McVeigh	Pair 1	1	"Born to Run"	Bottom two
Daniel Boys	Pair 1	2	"Maggie May"	Safe
Lewis Bradley	Pair 2	3	"I'm a Believer"	Bottom two
Lee Mead	Pair 2	4	"Leave Right Now"	Safe
Craig Chalmers	Solo Performance	5	"This is the Moment"	Safe
Ben Ellis	Pair 3	6	"Help Yourself"	Safe
Keith Jack	Pair 3	7	"Always on My Mind"	Safe

- Panel's verdict on who was not Joseph
  - John Barrowman: Rob McVeigh
  - Denise Van Outen: Rob McVeigh
  - Bill Kenwright: Rob McVeigh
  - Zoe Tyler: Daniel Boys

Sing-off:

Act	Sing Off Song	Results
Rob McVeigh	"Tell Me It's Not True" from Blood Brothers	Eliminated
Lewis Bradley	"Tell Me It's Not True" from Blood Brothers	Saved by Lloyd Webber

=== Week 6 (19 May 2007) ===
- Theme: Colors

With only six finalists remaining, the Josephs were announced in sets of three and performed in a trio as well as their individual performances.

- Group performances:
  - "Go, Go, Go Joseph"
  - Keith, Lewis and Ben: "That's Life" (Frank Sinatra)
  - Craig, Daniel and Lee: "Don't Rain on My Parade" (Barbra Streisand)
  - "She Loves You" (The Beatles)
- Mission:
  - Dating and trying to seduce Denise van Outen

Contestants' performances on the sixth live show
Contestant	Order	Song	Results
Keith Jack	1	"Brown Eyed Girl"	Safe
Lewis Bradley	2	"The Rose"	Bottom two
Ben Ellis	3	"Blue Suede Shoes"	Safe
Craig Chalmers	4	"Black or White"	Safe
Daniel Boys	5	"Evergreen"	Bottom two
Lee Mead	6	"Paint it Black"	Safe

- Panel's verdict on who was not Joseph
  - John Barrowman: Lewis Bradley
  - Denise Van Outen: Craig Chalmers
  - Bill Kenwright: Keith Jack
  - Zoe Tyler: Lewis Bradley

Sing-off:

Act	Sing Off Song	Results
Lewis Bradley	"Bring Him Home" from Les Misérables	Saved by Lloyd Webber
Daniel Boys	"Bring Him Home" from Les Misérables	Eliminated

Notes:

- Both Graham Norton and the panel expressed shock that Daniel was sent home much earlier than had been expected of him.

=== Week 7 (26 May 2007) ===
- Theme: The Five Themes of Joseph (Dreaming, Vulnerability, Betrayal, Courage and Arrogance)

One of the finalists was chosen by Josh Groban to perform "You Raise Me Up" with him live in front of the audience. Lee Mead was the lucky one while the remaining four were back-up singers.

- Group performances:
  - "A Pharaoh Story"
  - "Do You Love Me" (The Contours)
  - "Born to Be Wild" (Steppenwolf)
  - Lee Mead & The Josephs with Josh Groban: "You Raise Me Up"
- Mission:
  - Falling from heights to show courage

Contestants' performances on the seventh live show
Contestant	Order	Song	Results
Lee Mead	1	"Daydream Believer"	Safe
Ben Ellis	2	"Crying"	Bottom two
Craig Chalmers	3	"Suspicious Minds"	Bottom two
Lewis Bradley	4	"Hero"	Safe
Keith Jack	5	"Let Me Entertain You"	Safe

- Panel's verdict on who was not Joseph
  - John Barrowman: Lewis Bradley
  - Denise Van Outen: Lewis Bradley
  - Bill Kenwright: Ben Ellis
  - Zoe Tyler: Ben Ellis

Sing-off:

Act	Sing Off Song	Results
Ben Ellis	"I Made It Through the Rain"	Saved by Lloyd Webber
Craig Chalmers	"I Made It Through the Rain"	Eliminated

=== Week 8 (2 June 2007) ===
The semi-final was held on 2 June 2007, in which the remaining four Josephs competed for the three spots in the final. Again announced in sets of two, the contestants performed duets of Andrew Lloyd Webber songs with another Joseph in addition to their solo performance. At the end of the show, the three finalists were announced.

- Group performances:
  - "Jacob & Sons/Joseph's Coat"
  - Keith and Ben: "I am the Starlight" (from Starlight Express)
  - Lewis and Lee: "Oh What a Circus" (from Evita)
  - "Under Pressure" (Queen & David Bowie)
- Mission:
  - Being given a tour backstage at The Lord of the Rings musical

Contestants' performances on the eighth live show
Contestant	Order	Song	Results
Keith Jack	1	"Could It Be Magic"	Safe
Ben Ellis	2	"Ease On down the Road"	Bottom two
Lewis Bradley	3	"Sweet Caroline"	Bottom two
Lee Mead	4	"Livin' on a Prayer"	Safe

- Panel's verdict on who was not Joseph
  - John Barrowman: Lewis Bradley
  - Denise Van Outen: Lewis Bradley
  - Bill Kenwright: Ben Ellis
  - Zoe Tyler: Ben Ellis

Sing-off:

Act	Sing Off Song	Results
Ben Ellis	"I Dreamed a Dream" from Les Misérables	Eliminated
Lewis Bradley	"I Dreamed a Dream" from Les Misérables	Saved by Lloyd Webber

Notes:

- Ben later said he was disappointed in the panel's comments regarding his performance that week, but nevertheless accepted his elimination graciously.

=== Week 9 (9 June 2007) ===
The final, held on 9 June 2007, featured three songs from each of the Josephs: in addition to their regular performance, each performed a big band number and the final two repeated their favourite song from the series. The opening song was performed by all 12 Josephs, supported by the winner of a national Joseph Choir search – the choir of East Ham's Brampton Primary School in east London.

- Group performances:
  - All Josephs with the Brampton Primary School Choir: "Go, Go, Go Joseph"
  - Lee, Keith and Lewis: "Maria" (from West Side Story)
  - The Former Josephs: "The Boys Are Back in Town" (Thin Lizzy)
  - Keith and Lee: "Superstar" (from Jesus Christ Superstar)

Contestants' performances on the ninth live show
Contestant	Order	Song	Order	Big Band Song	Order	Previous Song	Result
Lewis Bradley	1	"Kiss"	4	"Beyond the Sea"	N/A	N/A (already eliminated)	Eliminated
Keith Jack	2	"For Once in My Life"	5	"Moondance"	7	"Always on My Mind"	Runner-up
Lee Mead	3	"(You're the) Devil in Disguise"	6	"Theme from New York, New York"	8	"Paint It Black"	Winner

The success of the programme prompted the BBC to extend the series by an extra week (week nine), removing the need for a double eviction prior to the final. The new date for the final, 9 June 2007, ensured it would air directly opposite the final of ITV's competing show, Grease is the Word. This move paid off as the final of Any Dream Will Do managed to secure the upper hand over Grease is the Word in viewing figures with a peak of 8.5 million viewers and an audience share of 39.6%, compared with ITV's high of 4.9 million viewers (an audience share of 23.5%).

In the final, over three million votes were cast with Lee Mead being announced as the winner. He sang "Any Dream Will Do" to close the series and his prize was six months (later extended to 18) in the lead role of a revival of Joseph and the Amazing Technicolor Dreamcoat in London's West End.

== After the series ==
=== Winner ===
Before the opening night of Joseph at London's Adelphi Theatre, publicity from the TV show had brought in £10 million in advance ticket sales, leading to a five-month extension to the show's run and an extension of Mead's contract until June 2008.

Mead's version of "Any Dream Will Do", along with "Close Every Door" performed by the three finalists, was released as a single to raise money for BBC Children in Need. It reached number two in the UK Singles Chart. He also opened the telethon, performing “any dream live in the BBC Television Centre with a choir of children onstage and 7 others around the country in: Blackpool, Lincoln, Basingstoke, Belfast, Birmingham, Glasgow and Cardiff. The performance cut to these choirs for 10 seconds each throughout the song.

His first public performance after the win was on 1 July 2007 at the Concert for Diana at London's Wembley Stadium, where he sang "Any Dream Will Do" with former Joseph actors Donny Osmond and Jason Donovan.

Mead, along with the winner, Connie Fisher and last five runners-up of the previous Lloyd-Webber reality show How Do You Solve a Problem Like Maria? starred in a one-off Christmas Eve special on BBC One entitled When Joseph Met Maria.

=== Other finalists ===
Fifth-placed Craig Chalmers was cast by Bill Kenwright as Joseph in the touring version of Joseph from 20 August 2007. The tour was due to have its first night in Bromley, London, less than 24 km (about 15 miles) from the Adelphi, where Kenwright was co-producer. In Chalmers' last week before viewers voted him off the programme, Kenwright had told him: "You wowed the audience and please God you are here next week for the semi-final." Chris Barton played Benjamin on the tour and at some matinees Joseph or the Narrator. He then went on to be a Swing in Spring Awakening in both Hammersmith and the Novello Theatre in the West End. Kenwright employed Chris Crosby on his national tour of Half a Sixpence opening on 28 August 2007 at the Churchill Theatre in Bromley.

Keith Jack joined the cast of the touring Joseph production with Chalmers and Barton. He played the Narrator, a part usually played by a woman though originally written for a male voice. His first official performance was on 1 October in Plymouth although he performed a couple of the final shows in High Wycombe on 28 and 29 September. In June 2010, Jack took the Dreamcoat from Chalmers and continued his role till May 2013.

In January 2008 Antony Hansen joined the cast of Kenwright's touring production of Joseph as a brother. During this time Kenwright formed a boy band named Dream On from the contestants on Any Dream Will Do. Hansen and fellow finalists Chalmers, Bradley, Crosby and Barton's debut album became a chart success in its first two weeks. In May 2008, Kenwright cast Hansen as Pharaoh in the national tour of Joseph. In January/February 2009 Hansen played the lead role of Joseph for Kenwright. Hansen joined the West End cast of Les Misérables in June 2009 in the ensemble and first cover Marius. July 2009 saw Hansen and fellow Any Dream Will Do contestant Craig Chalmers finish recording their second album together with BK Productions – Saturday Night at the Movies.

Lewis Bradley was contracted by Lloyd Webber to play Joseph at the Adelphi Theatre during Mead's holiday absence, and possibly for an additional performance a week. Meanwhile, Ben James-Ellis (Ben Ellis, who adopted the name James-Ellis for Equity purposes) landed the role of Link Larkin in the UK premiere of Hairspray: The Musical at the Shaftesbury Theatre from 11 October 2007. Daniel Boys went on to land many roles including performing in the Royal Festival Hall's concert production of Sweeney Todd, Landor Theatre's I Love You Because and the lead role of Princeton in Avenue Q at the Noël Coward Theatre. He also took part in the cabaret If You've Got It Flaunt It at the West End's Trafalgar Studios in September 2007.

Rob McVeigh entered the United Kingdom selection process for the Eurovision Song Contest 2008. In a unique Joseph vs. Maria showdown, he lost the heat to his Maria counterpart Simona Armstrong.

Johndeep More went on to appear in Nevermind The Broadway and a pantomime Cinderella (with Crosby).

Craig Chalmers was to appear as Prince Charming in a pantomime, but was sacked when it came to light that he had previously appeared in porn films.

== Criticism ==
In an interview with The Stage, the then-recently eliminated Daniel Boys questioned Andrew Lloyd Webber's stated aim of casting a Joseph outside the stereotype, "who's a bit of a Justin Timberlake, tiny touch of the Michael Jacksons and a bit of the Jude Laws," by pointing out that so far all the Josephs that were a bit outside of the traditional mould had been eliminated for exactly that reason.

== Ratings ==
Ratings taken from BARB.

Show	Date	Official rating (millions)	BBC1 weekly ranking	Share
Auditions 1	31 March 2007	6.85	6	30.8%
Auditions 2	7 April 2007	6.03	10	29.8%
Live Show 1	14 April 2007	6.16	10	29.3%
Results 1	14 April 2007	6.29	9	30.7%
Live Show 2	21 April 2007	5.48	14	27.0%
Results 2	21 April 2007	5.52	13	25.7%
Live Show 3	28 April 2007	5.66	11	29.1%
Results 3	28 April 2007	5.58	12	24.0%
Live Show 4	5 May 2007	5.66	12	28.2%
Results 4	5 May 2007	5.19	14	23.2%
Live Show 5	12 May 2007	5.26	17	27.7%
Live Show 6	19 May 2007	6.14	10	29.2%
Results 6	19 May 2007	6.17	9	28.3%
Live Show 7	26 May 2007	6.18	10	28.9%
Results 7	26 May 2007	6.77	7	31.5%
Live Show 8	2 June 2007	6.45	8	33.2%
Results 8	2 June 2007	6.71	6	31.6%
Final	9 June 2007	6.80	6	33.9%
Final Results	9 June 2007	8.28	3	36.8%
Average		6.17	—N/a	29.4%
