= Francesca Jackson =

British actor-singer

- Born: Francesca Jackson; 6 December 1983 (age 42); Wolverhampton, England
- Occupations: Actress, Singer
- Years active: 1994–

Francesca Jackson (born 6 December 1983) is a musical theatre actress. She took part in the Reality television show I'd Do Anything and lost out the role of Nancy to Jodie Prenger.

== Background ==
Jackson was born in Wolverhampton, England to parents, Mel and Steve Jackson. She later moved to Ystalyfera, Swansea where she grew up and where her parents still live today. She has a BA in musical arts.

She joined the National Youth Music Theatre in 1991, and starred in many productions such as Whistle Down the Wind and Bugsy Malone. Jackson now resides in London.

== Career ==
Although, receiving many acting and singing jobs since the age of 10, Francesca's first big break was playing Bet at the age of 14 in the Sam Mendes production of Oliver! at the London Palladium alongside Robert Lindsay and Sonia Swabey.

Jackson starred as Joanne in Rent remixed alongside Denise van Outen and she has also played the leading role of Alice in the workshop production of 'All the Fun of the Fair', directed by Nikolai Foster. She appeared in the 2006 production of 'Tonight's the night' as an understudy for Rachel Tucker (future I'd Do Anything contestant). Later, Francesca auditioned for Reality TV show I'd Do Anything attempting to win the part of Nancy. She was put through and eliminated fourth on the live show.

She once shared an apartment with Connie Fisher, the future winner of How Do You Solve a Problem Like Maria?.

Jackson was eliminated on the fourth show on 19 April, when she and fellow contestant, Ashley Russell received the fewest votes from the public. Both were put in the Sing-off, and Lloyd Webber saved Russell, therefore eliminating Jackson from the competition.

Since I'd Do Anything, Jackson has been cast alongside Chesney Hawkes and How Do You Solve a Problem Like Maria? finalist Siobhan Dillon as 'Lucy' in a new Barry Manilow based musical named Can't Smile Without You.

In 2009, Jackson toured with Bill Kenwright's Dreamboats and Petticoats from 14 September 2009 – 5 December 2009, playing the role of Sue. In February 2010: Jackson completed a weeks run of A Little Night Music in Paris, appearing alongside Lambert Wilson, Leslie Caron, Greta Sacchi, Rebecca Bottone, Leon Lopez, Deanne Meek, David Curry, Celeste de Veazey, Directed by Lee Blakely. She reprised her role as 'Sue' in Dreamboats and Petticoats from late February to early July 2010, and toured with the show after the West End run finished.

She will be part of the original West End cast of Million Dollar Quartet in the role of Dyanne.

In 2021 she was appearing in the West End production of Tina The Musical as Tina Turner's friend Rhonda Graam as the COVID-19 pandemic in the UK cooled and theatres re-opened.
