= Antony Hansen =

English actor, singer and songwriter

- Born: Antony Stuart Hansen; 12 October 1989 (age 36)

Antony Stuart Hansen (born 12 October 1989 in Southampton, Hampshire, United Kingdom) is an English actor, singer, songwriter and bathroom fitter who is best known for his roles in London's West End.

== Early life ==
Hansen attended St Birinus School in Didcot. He took part in amateur dramatics from childhood. As a teenager, he worked in telesales and as a garage attendant.

== Career ==
Hansen trained at Mountview Academy of Theatre Arts in London, and was the youngest finalist on BBC One's search for Joseph Any Dream Will Do. Since leaving the show took part in the West End stage in shows such as The Phantom of The Opera, Wicked and most recently, Les Misérables. He appeared in the 2009 touring production of Joseph and the Amazing Technicolor Dreamcoat as Pharaoh and later as Joseph.

As of 2025, Hansen is a Northamptonshire-based carpenter, tiler and bathroom fitter who runs his own business, Remodel Home Improvement.

He previously posted his work on TikTok under the username Thatbaldtiler.

== Personal life ==
Hansen married his wife in 2014. They have two sons.

== Credits ==
=== Television ===
Year	Show	Role	Station
2007	Any Dream Will Do	Contestant	BBC
2007	When Joseph Met Maria	As himself	BBC
2007	The Alan Titchmarsh Show	As himself	Channel 4
2007	This Morning	As himself	ITV
2009	Songs of Praise	As himself	BBC
2010	The Susan Boyle Story	London Cast of Les Misérables	ITV
2010	I Dreamed The Dream	25th Anniversary Cast of Les Misérables	BBC
2013	The Les Misérables Movie Special	West End Cast of Les Misérables	ITV

=== Concerts ===
Year	Production	Role	Location
2007	An Audience with Antony Hansen	As himself	The New Theatre, Oxford
2007	Dream on LIVE at The London Palladium	Member of Boy Band, Dream On	London Palladium, London
2010	Les Misérables in Concert: The 25th Anniversary	Sailor 2	O2 Arena, London
2010	LIVE from the West End	Special guest artist	UK National Tour
2011	Get Motivated Great Britain 2011	Special guest artist	LG Arena, Birmingham
2014	Direct From The West End	Special guest artist	UK National Tour
2015	A to Z of Musicals	Special guest artist	UK National Tour

=== Theatre ===
Year	Production	Role	Theatre	Location
2008	Joseph and the Amazing Technicolor Dreamcoat	Pharaoh	—N/a	UK National Tour
2009	Joseph and the Amazing Technicolor Dreamcoat	Joseph	—N/a	UK National Tour
2009	Les Misérables	Swing / Understudy Marius	Sondheim Theatre	West End
2010	Gutter Press	Freddie	Riverside Studios	Hammersmith
2011	Wicked	Ensemble / Understudy Fiyero	Apollo Victoria Theatre	West End
2011	Aladdin	Aladdin	Fairfield Halls	Croydon
2012	A Tale of Two Cities	Charles Darnay	Charing Cross Theatre	Off-West End
2012–14	The Phantom of the Opera	Ensemble / Understudy Raoul	Her Majesty's Theatre	West End
2015	War of the Worlds	Ensemble / Understudy Preacher	Dominion Theatre	West End
2016–17	Les Misérables	Montparnasse / Understudy Jean Valjean	Sondheim Theatre	West End
2017–19	Les Misérables	Courfeyrac / Understudy Jean Valjean	Sondheim Theatre	West End
