= The Friary School =

The Friary School (Academy)

Location
- Eastern Avenue; Lichfield, Staffordshire, WS13 7EW; England; 52°41′40″N 1°50′50″W

Information
- Type: Academy
- Motto: Latin: Inservi Deo Et Laetare (Serve God and be Cheerful)
- Established: 1892
- Founder: George M Green
- Local authority: Staffordshire
- Trust: Primitas Learning Partnership
- Department for Education URN: 124422 Tables
- Ofsted: Reports
- President: Donald F Wilson
- Head Teacher: Mark Drury
- Gender: Mixed
- Age: 11 to 18
- Enrolment: 1,194
- Houses: Garrick (Blue) Seward (Green) Darwin (Orange) Johnson (Purple)
- Colours: Yellow, Red, Black
- Former names: Lichfield High School for Girls; Friary Grange School; The Friary High School
- Website: www.friaryschool.co.uk

The Friary School (formerly Friary Grange) is a mixed secondary school and sixth form located in Lichfield, Staffordshire, England. The school became an arts and sports college in 2006 and despite this status being withdrawn by the DofE in 2010 the subjects remain high-profile in the school and local community.

The school shares its sporting facilities, including astro-turf pitches and a sports hall with Lichfield Council for school use (after the closure of the neighbouring leisure centre).

== History ==
With the introduction of Comprehensive secondary education in the period 1970-73 a new school opened on Eastern Avenue as Friary Grange initially taking older pupils. The former girls' grammar school at St.John Street was renamed The Friary and catered for younger pupils. The school was finally united at Eastern Avenue as The Friary in 1987. The St. John Street site became Lichfield college with the city library and records office moving to the site in 1989. In 2022, an extension on the Sixth Form Center was built.

Previously a community school administered by Staffordshire County Council, in September 2019 The Friary School converted to academy status. The school is now sponsored by the Primitas Learning Partnership.

== Notable former pupils ==
- Sian Brooke, actress
- Siobhan Dillon, actress and singer
- John Eccleston, puppeteer, writer, television presenter and programme creator
- Daniel Sturridge, England and Liverpool FC footballer
- Brad Foster (boxer), British Title-Winning Boxer
- Levi Davis (rugby union), Rugby player
