= I'd Do Anything (2008 TV series) =

British television series

- Created by: Bea Ballard
- Presented by: Graham Norton
- Judges: Andrew Lloyd Webber; John Barrowman; Denise Van Outen; Barry Humphries; Cameron Mackintosh; David Grindrod
- Country of origin: United Kingdom
- No. of series: 1
- No. of episodes: 22

Production
- Production location: BBC TVC - TC1
- Running time: 30–90mins
- Production company: BBC

Original release
- Network: BBC One, BBC HD
- Release: 15 March – 31 May 2008

Related
- Any Dream Will Do (2007); Over the Rainbow (2010)

I'd Do Anything is a 2008 talent show-themed television series produced by the BBC in the United Kingdom and broadcast on BBC One. It premièred on 15 March 2008. The show centred on a search for a new, unknown lead to play Nancy and three young performers who would play Oliver Twist in the 2009 West End revival of the British musical Oliver!.

The show, named after the Oliver! song "I'd Do Anything", was hosted by Graham Norton with Andrew Lloyd Webber again overseeing the programme, together with theatrical producer Cameron Mackintosh. In January 2008, John Barrowman confirmed he would be taking part in the show. The BBC also confirmed in late February 2008 that Barry Humphries would join Barrowman and Denise Van Outen (who was previously the presenter of the US Broadway reality show Grease: You're the One that I Want!) on the judging panel of the show.

Auditions for the show began in January 2008, with the show airing on BBC One throughout March, April and May 2008. In the final, on 31 May, Jodie Prenger was announced as the winner of the series.

== Format ==
Commissioned after the success of the two similar BBC series How Do You Solve A Problem Like Maria? and Any Dream Will Do, the series followed the same format to find a new unknown lead, but with two roles rather than one as in the previous two series. However, whilst the format for the Nancy was the same with the public choosing the winner, the three boys who would play the part of Oliver were chosen by the judging panel.

=== Criteria ===
Auditions took place in 2008; in Belfast on 24 January, Manchester on 26–27 January, London from 1 to 3 February and Glasgow on 6 February with auditions for both parts taking place at the same venues and dates.

Nancy

For the role of Nancy applicants needed to be aged 17 or over on 1 January 2008, with the playing age being 17–35. Entry was open to both amateur and professional performers. Stages one and two were the same as for the part of Oliver. At stage three though, the call-backs took place between 16 and 18 February when the show's panel interviewed the auditionees. There were then workshops and final audition performances between 21 and 26 February; and throughout mid-March, April and May for the television show. The "Nancys" had to impress the panel in the first two shows and, from programme three, they also had to gain viewer support to stay in with a chance of winning the role of Nancy.

Oliver

For the role of Oliver applicants needed to be at least nine on 1 January 2008 and no older than 14 on 31 December 2008 with the part of Oliver being from nine to twelve years old. The auditions were in two stages. Those who made it through to the second stage were filmed and then twelve young performers went through to stage three, the live television show where each week they learned a piece to perform on the show. Eight boys went through to the semi-final. Three boys were then chosen in the final stage, with one of the final three performing at the press night of Oliver! Following expert advice in providing a duty of care to child contributors, the BBC announced on 13 March that the boys would not face a public vote, and that each week the "Olivers" would be performing musical tasks, learning the tricks of the theatre trade and also perform as a group, before the judging panel make their final choices.

=== Auditions ===
The first programme, which aired on 15 March, charted the journeys of thousands of auditionees as they begin their quest for stardom in the regional auditions.

For the role of Nancy, just over a hundred young women were called to London to perform before the panel, consisting of John Barrowman, Denise Van Outen and David Grindrod. Those who stood out then had the chance to win a place at Nancy School, the next stage in the competition. For the role of Oliver, 50 young boys were selected to work with musical theatre experts before the final twelve were chosen for the live shows by Andrew Lloyd Webber and Cameron Mackintosh.

The second programme, which aired on 22 March, focussed mainly on the 42 women at Nancy School and the procedure of finding the final twelve women to compete in the weekly live show for the part of Nancy. The twelve boys who would compete on the live show for the part of Oliver were also introduced throughout the programme.

=== Weekly format ===
Saturday - Live

The show opens with a group number by the Nancys and Olivers. Each Nancy then performs a song, with feedback provided by the panel and Lloyd Webber. The public votes for the contestant they wish to keep in the show. Voting closes shortly after the broadcast of the Saturday programme.

Footage of the Olivers' progress is shown, during which Andrew Lloyd Webber and Cameron Mackintosh select one to proceed through to the semi-final.

Sunday - Recorded after live show on Saturdays.

The Oliver who was announced as a semi-finalist takes the lead with the other Olivers in a song. After the results of the public vote have been processed, the two Nancys with the fewest votes enter a "sing-off". Lloyd Webber then chooses which Nancy from the "sing-off" to save each week. The eliminated Nancy takes the lead in their sing-out medley of "Be Back Soon" and "As Long as He Needs Me".

== Finalists ==
=== Nancy ===
Twelve potential Nancys made it through the audition rounds and performed during the live shows. Each Nancy wore a unique coloured dress and a locket. At the end of every live show, the losing Nancy would have the locket stripped off by the Nancy who survived the singoff. In the final, on 31 May 2008, Jodie Prenger was announced as the winner.

Finalist	Age *	From	Dress Colour	Status
Amy Booth-Steel	24	Birmingham	Lime Green	Eliminated 1st in week 1
Cleopatra "Cleo" Royer	22	London	Lilac	Eliminated 2nd in week 2
Tara Bethan	24	Conwy	Orange	Eliminated 3rd in week 3
Francesca Jackson	24	West Glamorgan	Baby Pink	Eliminated 4th in week 4
Keisha Amponsa-Banson	23	London	Gold	Eliminated 5th in week 5
Sarah Lark	25	Glamorgan	Pale Green	Eliminated 6th in week 6
Ashley J Russell	24	Falkirk	Dark Blue	Eliminated 7th in week 7
Niamh Perry	17	Bangor, Northern Ireland	Pink	Eliminated 8th in week 8
Rachel Tucker	26	Belfast	Yellow	Eliminated 9th in week 9
Samantha Barks	17	Laxey, Isle of Man	Blue	3rd Place (Eliminated in week 10)
Jessie Buckley	18	Killarney, Ireland	Dark Green	Runner-up
Jodie Prenger	28	Blackpool	Purple	Winner

* as of the start of the series

=== Oliver ===
Twelve potential Olivers made it through the audition rounds and performed in the live shows. Each Oliver was identified with a different coloured scarf, and during the first eight live shows, the Oliver who did best in the mission for that week made it through to the final eight. This Oliver would also receive a hat, and lead vocals in a performance with all the Olivers on the live show. Ultimately, Gwion Jones, Harry Stott and Laurence Jeffcoate were announced as the three winning Olivers in week nine on 24 May.

Finalist	Age *	From	Scarf Colour	Lead Vocal	Reached	Result
Gareth Borrow	12	Derry	Pink	N/A	Final 12	Eliminated in Week 8
Jordan Li-Smith	13	Wrexham	Red	N/A	Final 12	Eliminated in Week 8
Joseph McNamara	9	Berkshire	Yellow	N/A	Final 12	Eliminated in Week 8
Sam Cotton	10	Hampshire	Dark Blue	N/A	Final 12	Eliminated in Week 8
Chester McKee	12	London	Dark Red	Week 2	Final 8	Eliminated in Week 9
Arthur Byrne	10	Bristol	Purple	Week 3	Final 8	Eliminated in Week 9
Kwayedza Kureya	13	Kent	Light Blue	Week 4	Final 8	Eliminated in Week 9
Alexander Hockaday	11	London	Dark Orange	Week 5	Final 8	Eliminated in Week 9
Jonny Clowes	13	Leamington Spa	Dark Green	Week 8	Final 8	Eliminated in Week 9
Gwion Jones	11	Carmarthenshire	Light Green	Week 1	Top 3	Winner
Harry Stott	12	Oxfordshire	Orange	Week 6	Top 3	Winner
Laurence Jeffcoate	11	Cheshire	Beige	Week 7	Top 3	Winner

- as of the start of the series

=== Results summary ===
Colour key

–	Contestant was in the bottom two and who was saved after the sing off
–	Contestant was eliminated after the sing off
–	Contestant who received the most public votes

Weekly results per contestant
Contestant	Week 1	Week 2	Week 3	Week 4	Week 5	Week 6	Week 7	Quarter Final	Semi Final	Final
Jodie Prenger	Safe	Safe	Safe	Safe	Safe	Safe	Safe	Safe	Safe	Winner (week 10)
Jessie Buckley	Safe	Safe	Safe	Safe	Safe	Safe	Safe	Safe	Safe	Runner-up (week 10)
Samantha Barks	Safe	Safe	Safe	Safe	Safe	Safe	Safe	Safe	4th	3rd Place (week 10)
Rachel Tucker	Safe	Safe	Safe	Safe	Safe	7th	Safe	4th	3rd	Eliminated (week 9)
Niamh Perry	Safe	Safe	Safe	Safe	7th	Safe	5th	5th	Eliminated (week 8)	
Ashley J Russell	Safe	Safe	Safe	9th	Safe	Safe	6th	Eliminated (week 7)		
Sarah Lark	Safe	Safe	Safe	Safe	Safe	6th	Eliminated (week 6)			
Keisha Amponsa-Banson	Safe	11th	10th	Safe	8th	Eliminated (week 5)				
Francesca Jackson	11th	Safe	Safe	8th	Eliminated (week 4)					
Tara Bethan	Safe	Safe	9th	Eliminated (week 3)						
Cleo Royer	Safe	10th	Eliminated (week 2)							
Amy Booth-Steel	12th	Eliminated (week 1)								

== Live shows ==
=== Week 1 (29/30 March) ===
Gwion Jones was announced as the first Oliver semi-finalist on the Saturday show.

The show performances and missions were:

- Group performances:
  - Nancys and Olivers: "I'd Do Anything"
  - Olivers: "Food, Glorious Food"
  - Nancys: "Sound of the Underground"
  - Gwion and the Olivers: "Bright Eyes"
- Missions:
  - Nancys: Working in an East End market
  - Olivers: Learning magic tricks with Paul Kieve

Contestants' performances on the first live show
Act	Performance Pair	Order	Song	Result
Jessie Buckley	Pair 1	1	"River Deep - Mountain High" (Tina Turner)	Safe
Jodie Prenger	Pair 1	2	"Chasing Pavements" (Adele)	Safe
Tara Bethan	Pair 2	3	"Suddenly I See" (KT Tunstall)	Safe
Ashley J Russell	Pair 2	4	"Black Velvet" (Alannah Myles)	Safe
Amy Booth-Steel	Pair 3	5	"Respect" (Aretha Franklin)	Bottom two
Keisha Amponsa-Banson	Pair 3	6	"Mad About the Boy" (Dinah Washington)	Safe
Francesca Jackson	Pair 4	7	"Hero" (Mariah Carey)	Bottom two
Rachel Tucker	Pair 4	8	"About You Now" (Sugababes)	Safe
Samantha Barks	Pair 5	9	"I Love Rock 'n' Roll" (Joan Jett & the Blackhearts)	Safe
Sarah Lark	Pair 5	10	"Get Here" (Oleta Adams)	Safe
Cleo Royer	Pair 6	11	"Who Knew" (Pink)	Safe
Niamh Perry	Pair 6	12	"The First Cut Is the Deepest" (Cat Stevens)	Safe

- Panel's verdict on who was not Nancy:
  - John Barrowman: Amy Booth-Steel
  - Denise Van Outen: Tara Bethan
  - Barry Humphries: Amy Booth-Steel

Sing-off:

Act	Sing Off Song	Results
Amy Booth-Steel	"Tell Me on a Sunday"	Eliminated
Francesca Jackson	"Tell Me on a Sunday"	Saved by Lloyd Webber

=== Week 2 (5/6 April) ===
Chester McKee was announced as the second Oliver semi-finalist on the Saturday show.

The show performances and missions were:

- Group performances:
  - Nancys: "Oom-Pah-Pah"
  - Olivers: "Electricity" from Billy Elliot the Musical
  - Nancys: "Enough is Enough"
  - Chester and the Olivers: "Pie Jesu"
- Missions:
  - Nancys: Facing their fears interacting with rats and acting with Steven Hartley as Bill Sykes
  - Olivers: Acting class in the West End at Billy Elliot the Musical

Contestants' performances on the second live show
Act	Performance Pair	Order	Song	Result
Niamh Perry	Pair 1	1	"I've Got the Music in Me" (The Kiki Dee Band)	Safe
Cleo Royer	Pair 1	2	"Feeling Good" (Nina Simone)	Bottom two
Keisha Amponsa-Banson	Pair 2	3	"Get the Party Started" (Pink)	Bottom two
Samantha Barks	Pair 2	4	"See the Day" (Dee C. Lee)	Safe
Francesca Jackson	Solo Performance	5	"Somebody to Love" (Queen)	Safe
Rachel Tucker	Pair 3	6	"Beautiful" (Christina Aguilera)	Safe
Sarah Lark	Pair 3	7	"Piece of My Heart" (Erma Franklin)	Safe
Tara Bethan	Pair 4	8	"Without You" (Harry Nilsson)	Safe
Jodie Prenger	Pair 4	9	"I'm Every Woman" (Chaka Khan)	Safe
Ashley J Russell	Pair 5	10	"Mercy" (Duffy)	Safe
Jessie Buckley	Pair 5	11	"Killing Me Softly with His Song" (Roberta Flack)	Safe

- Panel's verdict on who was not Nancy:
  - John Barrowman: Samantha Barks
  - Denise Van Outen: Keisha Amponsa-Banson
  - Barry Humphries: Keisha Amponsa-Banson

Sing-off:

Act	Sing Off Song	Results
Cleo Royer	"I Know Him So Well" from Chess	Eliminated
Keisha Amponsa-Banson	"I Know Him So Well" from Chess	Saved by Lloyd Webber

=== Week 3 (12/13 April) ===
Arthur Byrne was announced as the third Oliver semi-finalist on the Saturday show.

The show performances and missions were:

- Group performances:
  - Nancys: "It's a Fine Life"
  - Olivers: "Teamwork" from Chitty Chitty Bang Bang
  - Nancys: "Good Morning Baltimore" from the musical Hairspray
  - Arthur and the Olivers "A Whole New World" from the film Aladdin
- Missions:
  - Nancys: Losing their inhibitions by performing the love scene from the musical Hairspray with Ben James-Ellis in front of their fathers.
  - Olivers: Learning teamwork and stamina at Tottenham Hotspur Training Academy with club captain, Robbie Keane.
- Theme: Songs from Musicals or Films

Contestants' performances on the third live show
Act	Performance Pair	Order	Song	Musical/Film	Result
Rachel Tucker	Pair 1	1	"Oh, What a Night" (The Four Seasons)	Jersey Boys	Safe
Sarah Lark	Pair 1	2	"Maybe This Time" (Liza Minnelli)	Cabaret	Safe
Francesca Jackson	Pair 2	3	"(I've Had) The Time of My Life"(Bill Medley & Jennifer Warnes)	Dirty Dancing	Safe
Keisha Amponsa-Banson	Pair 2	4	"The Lady Is a Tramp"(Ella Fitzgerald)	Babes in Arms	Bottom two
Ashley J Russell	Pair 3	5	"The Winner Takes It All"(ABBA)	Mamma Mia!	Safe
Jodie Prenger	Pair 3	6	"Send in the Clowns"(Judy Collins)	A Little Night Music	Safe
Niamh Perry	Pair 4	7	"Moon River" (Audrey Hepburn)	Breakfast at Tiffany's	Safe
Jessie Buckley	Pair 4	8	"One Night Only" (Jennifer Hudson)	Dreamgirls	Safe
Tara Bethan	Pair 5	9	"Let's Hear It for the Boy" (Deniece Williams)	Footloose	Bottom two
Samantha Barks	Pair 5	10	"Somewhere" (Barbra Streisand)	West Side Story	Safe

- Panel's verdict on who was not Nancy:
  - John Barrowman: Tara Bethan
  - Denise Van Outen: Keisha Amponsa-Banson
  - Barry Humphries: Tara Bethan

Sing-off:

Act	Sing Off Song	Results
Keisha Amponsa-Banson	"Somewhere Over the Rainbow" from The Wizard of Oz	Saved by Lloyd Webber
Tara Bethan	"Somewhere Over the Rainbow" from The Wizard of Oz	Eliminated

=== Week 4 (19/20 April) ===
Kwayedza Kureya was announced as the fourth Oliver semi-finalist on the Saturday show.

The show performances and missions were:

- Group performances:
  - Nancys and Olivers: "Consider Yourself"
  - Olivers: "I Whistle a Happy Tune" from The King and I
  - Nancys: "Viva Las Vegas"
  - Kwayedza and the Olivers: "I'll Be There"
- Missions:
  - Nancys: Performing "I'm Not that Girl" from the musical Wicked in front of a West End audience at the Apollo Victoria Theatre
  - Olivers: Testing their bravery by abseiling
- Theme: Las Vegas Divas

Contestants' performances on the fourth live show
Act	Performance Pair	Order	Song	Vegas Legend	Result
Jodie Prenger	Pair 1	1	"9 to 5"	Dolly Parton	Safe
Samantha Barks	Pair 1	2	"Hurt"	Christina Aguilera	Safe
Ashley J Russell	Pair 2	3	"I Wanna Dance with Somebody"	Whitney Houston	Bottom two
Niamh Perry	Pair 2	4	"Wind Beneath My Wings"	Bette Midler	Safe
Keisha Amponsa-Banson	Solo Performance	5	"My Heart Will Go On"	Celine Dion	Safe
Jessie Buckley	Pair 3	6	"Why Do Fools Fall in Love"	Diana Ross	Safe
Sarah Lark	Pair 3	7	"Midnight Train to Georgia"	Gladys Knight	Safe
Francesca Jackson	Pair 4	8	"What's Love Got to Do with It"	Tina Turner	Bottom two
Rachel Tucker	Pair 4	9	"The Way We Were"	Barbra Streisand	Safe

- Panel's verdict on who was not Nancy:
  - John Barrowman: Keisha Amponsa-Banson
  - Denise Van Outen: Keisha Amponsa-Banson
  - Barry Humphries: Francesca Jackson

Sing-off:

Act	Sing Off Song	Results
Ashley J Russell	"Whistle Down The Wind"	Saved by Lloyd Webber
Francesca Jackson	"Whistle Down The Wind"	Eliminated

=== Week 5 (26/27 April) ===
Alexander Hockaday was announced as the fifth Oliver semi-finalist on the Saturday show.

The show performances and missions were:

- Group performances:
  - Nancys and Olivers: "You've Got to Pick a Pocket or Two"
  - Olivers: "It's the Hard Knock Life" from Annie
  - Nancys: "Sisters Are Doin' It for Themselves"
  - Alexander and the Olivers: "Can You Feel the Love Tonight" from The Lion King
- Missions:
  - Nancys: Testing their physical fitness by rowing and teamwork by then racing in two teams
  - Olivers: Learning stage fighting

Contestants' performances on the fifth live show
Act	Performance Pair	Order	Song	Result
Niamh Perry	Pair 1	1	"Valerie" (Amy Winehouse)	Bottom two
Rachel Tucker	Pair 1	2	"I'm with You" (Avril Lavigne)	Safe
Jessie Buckley	Pair 2	3	"Stop!" (Sam Brown)	Safe
Sarah Lark	Pair 2	4	"Ironic" (Alanis Morissette)	Safe
Keisha Amponsa-Banson	Pair 3	5	"I'm Outta Love" (Anastacia)	Bottom two
Ashley J Russell	Pair 3	6	"Evergreen" (from A Star Is Born)	Safe
Samantha Barks	Pair 4	7	"Since U Been Gone" (Kelly Clarkson)	Safe
Jodie Prenger	Pair 4	8	"I Have Nothing" (Whitney Houston)	Safe

- Panel's verdict on who was not Nancy:
  - John Barrowman: Keisha Amponsa-Banson
  - Denise Van Outen: Ashley J Russell
  - Barry Humphries: Keisha Amponsa-Banson

Sing-off:

Act	Sing Off Song	Results
Niamh Perry	"The Rose"	Saved by Lloyd Webber
Keisha Amponsa-Banson	"The Rose"	Eliminated

Notes:

- Before announcing his decision he said, "First, I'm going to say this is a complete and utter travesty, neither of you should be in the bottom two, it's completely wrong. I've been put into a situation that I have never wanted to be in. For the first time on a television show, I am angry." And after choosing to eliminate Keisha, he told her, "You were absolutely wonderful. I think you have a huge career ahead of you and all I can say is that I'll do anything I can to help you."

=== Week 6 (3/4 May) ===
Harry Stott was announced as the sixth Oliver semi-finalist on the Saturday show. The Olivers voted to choose one Nancy to perform with them on the Results Show and chose Sarah. Andrew Lloyd Webber worked with each of the Nancys in the week before the show to improve their performance, focusing on their acting abilities. He also gave each Nancy a "master class" to learn the sing-off song.

The show performances and missions were:

- Group performances:
  - Nancys and Olivers: "Who Will Buy?"
  - Olivers: "Breaking Free" from High School Musical
  - Nancys: "Fings Ain't Wot They Used T'Be" from the musical of the same name
  - Sarah, Harry and the Olivers: "Together (Wherever We Go)" from the musical Gypsy
- Missions:
  - Nancys: Improving their acting skills acting a piece from Blood Brothers and improving their cockney accent in an East End pub with actress Barbara Windsor
  - Olivers: Working with the cast of High School Musical on Stage! learning how to take direction
- Theme: Big Band

Contestants' performances on the sixth live show
Act	Performance Pair	Order	Song	Result
Jodie Prenger	Pair 1	1	"Luck Be a Lady" (from Guys and Dolls)	Safe
Sarah Lark	Pair 1	2	"Mr. Bojangles" (Sammy Davis Jr.)	Bottom two
Rachel Tucker	Pair 2	3	"For Once in My Life" (Stevie Wonder)	Bottom two
Samantha Barks	Pair 2	4	"Sway" (Dean Martin)	Safe
Niamh Perry	Solo Performance	5	"They Can't Take That Away from Me" (from Shall We Dance)	Safe
Jessie Buckley	Pair 3	6	"The Man that Got Away" (Judy Garland)	Safe
Ashley J Russell	Pair 3	7	"Big Spender" (from Sweet Charity)	Safe

- Panel's verdict on who was not Nancy:
  - John Barrowman: Jodie Prenger
  - Denise Van Outen: Sarah Lark
  - Barry Humphries: Ashley J Russell

Sing-off:

Act	Sing Off Song	Results
Sarah Lark	"As If We Never Said Goodbye" from Sunset Boulevard	Eliminated
Rachel Tucker	"As If We Never Said Goodbye" from Sunset Boulevard	Saved by Lloyd Webber

Notes:

- Andrew Lloyd Webber told Sarah after her elimination, "I have to think as a producer and I do think Rachel was rock solid, and there were moments that I did think that maybe you were a bit fragile", adding "but you were wonderful and you did exactly what I asked."

=== Week 7 (10/11 May) ===
Laurence Jeffcoate was announced as the seventh Oliver semi-finalist on the Saturday show. The Olivers voted to choose one Nancy to perform with them on the Results Show and chose Niamh. During the week Lloyd Webber took the Nancys to the O_{2} Arena to see Celine Dion in concert.

The show performances and missions were:

- Group performances:
  - Nancys: "It's A Fine Life"
  - Olivers: "You Give a Little Love" from Bugsy Malone
  - Nancys: "Nobody Does It Better" from the film The Spy Who Loved Me
  - Niamh, Laurence and the Olivers: "Chitty Chitty Bang Bang" from the musical of the same name.
  - The Battle of the Nancys – Andrew Lloyd Webber divided the Nancy's by age into two trios to perform two songs:
    - "The Girls" – Jessie, Niamh and Samantha: "Candyman"
    - "The Women" – Ashley, Jodie and Rachel: "Man! I Feel Like a Woman!"
- Missions:
  - Nancys: James Bond style mission with John Barrowman, learning theatrical stunts.
  - Olivers: Visited the Ragged School Museum to learn how strict conditions were in workhouses and worked with actor Todd Carty learning the famous Oliver line, "Please Sir, I want some more."

Contestants' performances on the seventh live show
Act	Order	Song	Result
Jessie Buckley	1	"Fighter" (Christina Aguilera)	Safe
Niamh Perry	2	"True Colours" (Cyndi Lauper)	Bottom two
Ashley J Russell	3	"I Say a Little Prayer" (Dionne Warwick)	Bottom two
Samantha Barks	4	"Survivor" (Destiny's Child)	Safe
Jodie Prenger	5	"If I Ain't Got You" (Alicia Keys)	Safe
Rachel Tucker	6	"You've Got a Friend" (Carole King)	Safe

- Panel's verdict on who was not Nancy:
  - John Barrowman: Jessie Buckley
  - Denise Van Outen: Ashley J Russell
  - Barry Humphries: Rachel Tucker

Sing-off:

Act	Sing Off Song	Results
Niamh Perry	"Don't Cry for Me Argentina" from Evita	Saved by Lloyd Webber
Ashley J Russell	"Don't Cry for Me Argentina" from Evita	Eliminated

Notes:

- Some of Candyman's lyrics were altered in order to adhere to the family-orientated nature of the series, bearing in mind the song was about intercourse; the sentence "he's a one-stop shop, makes the panties drop" was changed to "he's a one-stop shop, really hit the spot". After the performance, Lloyd-Webber smirked, "We won't go into the lyrics of what you sang in too much detail."
- Lloyd Webber said after the sing off, "I've said Niamh is a little young for this, and I was very hard on you, Ashley," then saying "In the end, I've got to save Niamh." To Ashley he said, "I do want to say that you are a fantastic talent, but you don't communicate it on stage," adding that he would love to work with her one-day, and that her drama students "should be very proud."

=== Week 8 (17/18 May) ===
Week eight was the quarter-final stage of the series. Jonny Clowes was announced as the eighth and last Oliver semi-finalist on the Saturday show with Gareth Borrow, Jordan Li-Smith, Joseph McNamara and Sam Cotton leaving after the Saturday show.

The Nancys were joined by five of the finalists from Any Dream Will Do - Daniel Boys, Lewis Bradley, Ben James-Ellis, Keith Jack and Rob McVeigh to perform a group number. They were paired up: Rachel and Daniel; Jodie and Lewis; Jessie and Rob; Samantha and Ben; Niamh and Keith.

The show performances and missions were:

- Group performances:
  - Nancys and Olivers: "Consider Yourself"
  - Gareth, Jordan, Joseph, Sam and the Olivers: "Reach"
  - Josephs and Nancys: "Dancing in the Street"
  - Jonny and the rest of the Oliver semi-finalists: "I Have a Dream"
  - Nancys: "I'm Gonna Wash That Man Right Outa My Hair" from the musical South Pacific
- Missions:
  - Nancys: Learning a comedy routine from Life Coach with comedian Phill Jupitus and Life Coach creator, Nick Reed.
  - Olivers: Learning the scene from Oliver! where Oliver first meets the Artful Dodger with actor Daniel Barber (Gavroche in Les Misérables).

Contestants' performances on the eighth live show
Act	Order	Song	Result
Jodie Prenger	1	"Holding Out for a Hero" (Bonnie Tyler)	Safe
Rachel Tucker	2	"I Will Always Love You" (Dolly Parton)	Bottom two
Samantha Barks	3	"Defying Gravity" (from Wicked)	Safe
Jessie Buckley	4	"How Do I Live" (LeAnn Rimes)	Safe
Niamh Perry	5	"Don't Speak" (No Doubt)	Bottom two

- Panel's verdict on who was not Nancy:
  - John Barrowman: Jessie Buckley
  - Denise Van Outen: Niamh Perry
  - Barry Humphries: Niamh Perry

Sing-off:

Act	Sing Off Song	Results
Rachel Tucker	"Another Suitcase in Another Hall" from Evita	Saved by Lloyd Webber
Niamh Perry	"Another Suitcase in Another Hall" from Evita	Eliminated

Notes:

- After Niamh's elimination Lloyd Webber said, "Niamh, if I was casting Evita, I would seriously think of you for that role," adding, "Rachel I thought you handled it well, you warmed into the song." Of Niamh he said, "your voice just needs time to mature and I wouldn't be surprised if you weren't up for a major leading role when you're twenty."

=== Week 9 (24/25 May) ===
Week nine was the semi-final stage of the series. On 23 May the BBC announced that Cameron Mackintosh would be joining the panel for the semi-final to give his opinion on the four remaining Nancys and to announce, with Lloyd Webber, which three boys they chose as Oliver and that he would also be on the panel for the Grand-final. The four Nancys also appeared on The Paul O'Grady Show on Channel 4 singing "Oom-Pah-Pah".

Gwion Jones, Harry Stott and Laurence Jeffcoate were announced as the three winning Olivers on the Saturday show with Lloyd Webber saying, "Cameron and I agree we have three very different Olivers, but I think it's a great result and I think whichever Oliver you go and see you're going to get a fantastic performance." And Mackintosh adding, "The talent we have unearthed has been terrific."

Cameron Mackintosh confirmed that Rowan Atkinson will be performing the part of Fagin in the stage show. The four remaining Nancys were divided into pairs, The Northern Nancys and the Celtic Nancys for two group performances.

The show performances and missions were:

- Group performances:
  - Nancys and Olivers: "Food, Glorious Food"
  - The Northern Nancys (Jodie and Samantha): "Superstar" from the rock opera Jesus Christ Superstar
  - Olivers: "Tomorrow" from the musical Annie
  - The Celtic Nancys (Jessie and Rachel): "Buenos Aires" from the musical Evita
  - Alexander, Arthur, Chester, Jonny and Kwayedza: "No Matter What" from the musical Whistle Down the Wind
  - Nancys: "A Hard Day's Night" from the Beatles' film of the same name
  - Gwion, Harry and Laurence: "Where is Love?"
- Missions:
  - Nancys: A character building "Stepping back in time" task getting to grips with what life was like for Nancys spending time in an authentic Victorian home and speaking Nancy's love ballad, "As Long as He Needs Me" in front of Barry Humphries.
  - Olivers: Performing as Oliver in a West End theatre singing "Where is Love?" with advice from actor Jon Lee.

Contestants' performances on the ninth live show
Act	Order	Song	Result
Rachel Tucker	1	"Cabaret" (from Cabaret)	Bottom two
Jessie Buckley	2	"What I Did for Love" (from A Chorus Line)	Safe
Samantha Barks	3	"When You Believe" (from The Prince of Egypt)	Bottom two
Jodie Prenger	4	"Out Here on My Own" (Irene Cara)	Safe

- Panel's verdict on who was not Nancy:
  - John Barrowman: Jessie Buckley
  - Denise Van Outen: Jessie Buckley
  - Barry Humphries: Jodie Prenger
  - Cameron Mackintosh: Jodie Prenger

Sing-off:

Act	Sing Off Song	Results
Rachel Tucker	"Memory" from Cats	Eliminated
Samantha Barks	"Memory" from Cats	Saved by Lloyd Webber

Notes:

- Andrew Lloyd Webber expressed severe disappointment with the result, saying "Last night Cameron and I were both saying that we thought both of you would be fantastic Nancys and now here am I faced with this. But I've got to make a decision and I've got to think of where the show ultimately for Cameron is going to go and I think I have to go with you Samantha.

In the week following the show, it was claimed that Andrew Lloyd Webber and Cameron Mackintosh had fallen out over Lloyd Webber's decision to eliminate Rachel Tucker who Mackintosh had wanted to see in the final. Lloyd Webber said, "The fact is Cameron wanted Rachel to stay. He wanted Rachel and Samantha in the final from the beginning of the series. Rachel did a fantastic performance but I had to face up to the fact that she wouldn't have gone any further. What I may think professionally is sometimes different from what the public want. I saved Rachel three times and she still ended up in the bottom two."

In the week the semi-final aired, the four semi-finalists did a photoshoot for Now magazine recreating some of Madonna's iconic images. Jodie posed in a wedding dress to recreate the cover of the album Like a Virgin; Jessie copied a pose, wearing a black dress, from the music video for the song Like a Prayer, Samantha was dressed in hotpants copying the pose from the cover of the 2008 album, Hard Candy and Rachel posed in a cowboy hat, recreating the cover of the album Music.

=== Week 10 (31 May) ===
Week ten was the final week of the show and the Grand-final when the winning Nancy was revealed. Both shows aired live on Saturday with the main show starting at 6:00pm and the Results show at 8:45pm. The finalists were Jessie Buckley, Jodie Prenger and Samantha Barks.

On 30 May, Andrew Lloyd Webber revealed that Cameron Mackintosh was concerned about Jodie Prenger's "curvaceous figure" saying, "Cameron thinks she is a bit too big and has more or less said so". However, Webber defended Prenger, saying that she had both the vocal talents and personality for the role, saying "Jodie could be anybody's idea of Nancy - I can see it absolutely. She has got a lovely voice and a super personality. She has experience as well."

Also on 30 May, the BBC announced how voting would work in the final. With all the decisions now being from the public vote, the voting lines opened at the start of Show One. At the end of Show One, the finalist with the lowest number of viewers votes, Samantha was eliminated and therefore finished third. The voting lines then re-opened to vote for the series winner, with all the votes cast for the remaining two Nancys carried over. Then in Show Two the final two Nancys went head-to-head before the winner was announced as Jodie.

The three finalists were taken to Paris in the week leading up to the show. In London they met and had a "Master Class" with Liza Minnelli. All twelve Nancy finalists and all twelve Oliver finalists also performed. Lee Mead also performed on Show One. In Show two both Jessie and Jodie performed Nancy's love ballad "As Long as He Needs Me".

The show performances were:

- Group performances:
  - Nancys and Olivers*: "I'd Do Anything" (all twelve Nancy and all twelve Oliver finalists)
  - Laurence and Jodie: "Getting to Know You" from the musical The King and I
  - Harry and Samantha: "Singin' in the Rain" from the film Singin' in the Rain
  - Gwion and Jessie: "Truly Scrumptious" from the musical Chitty Chitty Bang Bang
  - Jessie, Jodie and Samantha "Maybe This Time" from the film Cabaret
  - Lee Mead and the Olivers "Any Dream Will Do" from the musical Joseph and the Amazing Technicolor Dreamcoat
  - Former Olivers and Nancys: "Never Forget"
- Theme: Emotional Showstoppers

Contestants' performances on the tenth live show part 1
Act	Order	Song	Result
Jodie Prenger	1	"Son of a Preacher Man"	Safe
Samantha Barks	2	"Anyone Who Had a Heart"	Third place
Jessie Buckley	3	"The First Time Ever I Saw Your Face"	Safe

- Theme: Winning song, song of the series

Contestants' performances on the tenth live show part 2
Act	Order	Song	Order	Song	Result
Jodie Prenger	1	"As Long as He Needs Me"	3	"I Have Nothing"	Winner
Jessie Buckley	2	"As Long as He Needs Me"	4	"The Man That Got Away"	Runner-Up

- Judges' verdicts on who was Nancy:
  - John Barrowman: Jodie Prenger
  - Denise Van Outen: Jodie Prenger
  - Barry Humphries: Jessie Buckley
  - Cameron Mackintosh: Jessie Buckley
  - Andrew Lloyd Webber: Jessie Buckley
- The Final Vote

The final vote was then announced and it was revealed that the winner was Jodie Prenger with Andrew Lloyd Webber saying, "The people's Nancy. Jodie was always going to be the people's choice." Cameron Mackintosh added, 'I'm thrilled for Jodie, congratulations!'

== Reception ==
In March 2008, the BBC drew criticism from American actor, Kevin Spacey, the artistic director of the Old Vic Theatre Company for airing shows such as I'd Do Anything and Any Dream Will Do which he claimed were distorting the theatre market in favour of musicals instead of straight plays. Spacey said, "I felt that was essentially a 13-week promotion for a musical - where's our 13-week programme?" and that he thought the BBC's talent shows were "crossing the line" and "unfair". The BBC responded that it "always reflected" other West End shows in its talent programmes. Adding that the shows were not unduly promotional and that the shows "celebrate musical theatre generally, not just one West End show". They also pointed out that the BBC had no commercial interest in the West End productions of Oliver!, Joseph and the Amazing Technicolor Dreamcoat or The Sound of Music.

Spacey's comments were criticised by Simon Cowell who stated, "It sounds like Russia in the Sixties, that mentality. I don't think that applies to the modern world. What the BBC does is very good for the West End because it reminds millions of people what the West End is all about – they're going to sell a lot of tickets off the back of that."

On 31 May 2008 it was revealed that the show regularly received over 6 million viewers. The first programme of the series which aired on 15 March, before the first live shows two weeks later, was watched by 5.5 million viewers, 24.2% of the total audience, in what the Entertainment and Media website Digital Spy described as "a weak debut".

After the week five shows it was revealed that the Saturday show was watched by 5.6 million viewers, 27% of the total audience, which although 0.5 million down on the previous week, was still 200,000 above the slot average. This was slightly ahead of the third episode of All Star Mr & Mrs, on ITV1 which had 5.2 million viewers (25.2%).

The final shows on 31 May were shown on the same night as the finals of the second series of Britain's Got Talent on ITV1 although the shows did not clash directly apart from a short period toward the end of the first show of I'd Do Anything. The total number of viewers for both shows was given as 20 million.

== Ratings ==
Ratings taken from BARB.

Show	Date	Official rating (millions)	BBC1 weekly ranking	Share
Auditions 1	15 March 2008	5.66	9	24.2%
Auditions 2	22 March 2008	5.75	11	24.7%
Live Show 1	29 March 2008	6.36	11	27.9%
Results 1	30 March 2008	5.67	14	24.0%
Live Show 2	5 April 2008	6.97	8	30.3%
Results 2	6 April 2008	6.51	10	26.7%
Live Show 3	12 April 2008	5.57	10	22.7%
Results 3	13 April 2008	6.07	8	26.0%
Live Show 4	19 April 2008	6.34	11	27.1%
Results 4	20 April 2008	5.41	16	22.8%
Live Show 5	26 April 2008	5.92	10	27.5%
Results 5	27 April 2008	5.75	11	24.0%
Live Show 6	3 May 2008	5.59	13	27.6%
Results 6	4 May 2008	5.40	17	26.3%
Live Show 7	10 May 2008	5.37	15	27.0%
Results 7	11 May 2008	6.15	10	30.0%
Live Show 8	17 May 2008	6.13	13	25.8%
Results 8	18 May 2008	6.66	9	30.4%
Live Show 9	24 May 2008	5.27	12	29.9%
Results 9	25 May 2008	6.41	7	30.7%
The Final	31 May 2008	5.46	10	32.3%
Final Results	31 May 2008	7.18	4	31.0%
Average		6.03	—N/a	27.2%

== Later series ==
Lloyd Webber next returned to BBC screens in 2010 with a similar series, Over the Rainbow, a search to find a new Dorothy for The Wizard of Oz, produced by his company, The Really Useful Group.
