= Gary Catona =

American author and voice coach

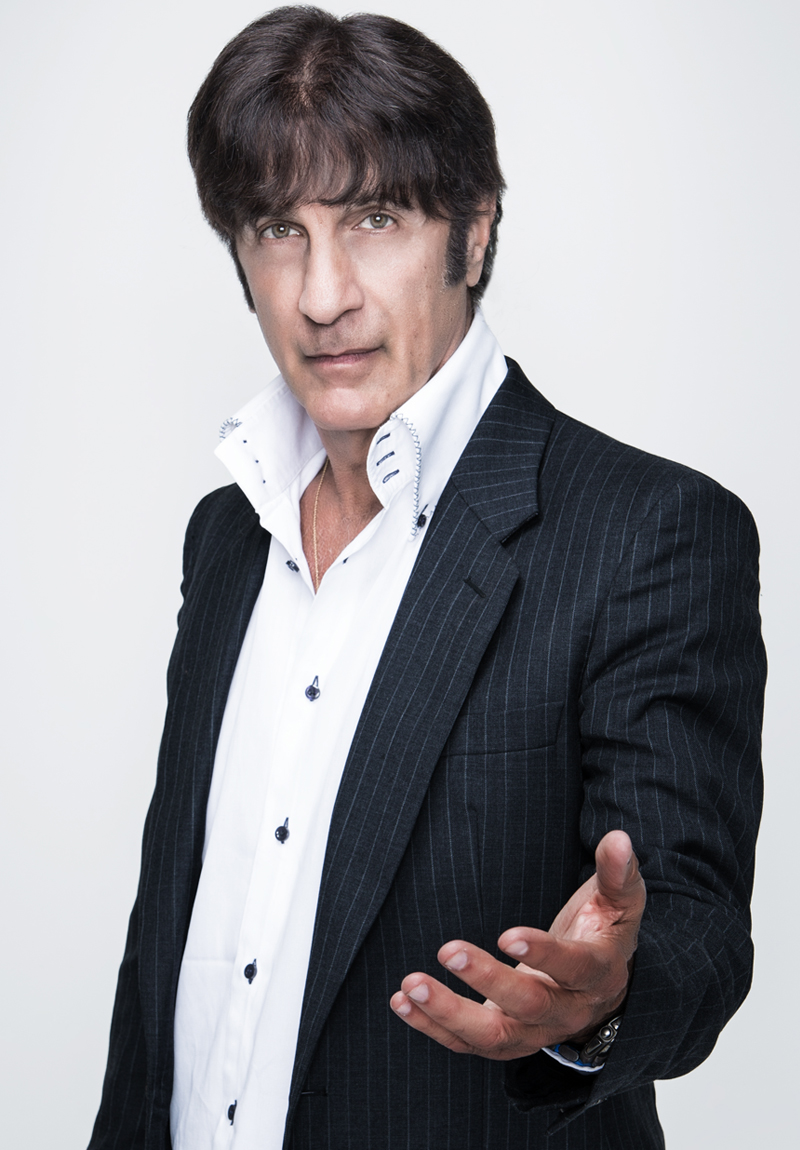
- Born: September 25, 1952 (age 72); Philadelphia, US
- Occupation(s): Voice coach and author

Gary Anthony Catona (born September 25, 1952) is an American author and voice coach, who describes himself as a "Voice Builder". His clients have included Whitney Houston, Andrea Bocelli and Muhammad Ali.

== Career ==
Catona was born in Philadelphia, Pennsylvania, and was educated at Pennsylvania State University. He moved to Austin, Texas in 1980 to research the mechanics of voice production and voice anatomy.

In 1982, Catona began to work with clients who had damaged their voices from accident, surgery, injury or illness. His clients have also included singers such as Andy Williams, Brian Wilson (The Beach Boys), Dawn Robinson (En Vogue), Babyface, Jesse McCartney, Paula Abdul and Lenny Kravitz. His clients have also included actors such as Patrick Swayze, Jeff Goldblum, Kevin Spacey, Mark Wahlberg, Patrick Bergin, Liza Minnelli, Shirley MacLaine and Charles Dance.

== Bibliography ==
- Thinking as Sport and Dance: Learn the Power of Creative Thinking ISBN 978-0595433742 (2008)
- A Revolution in Singing (2012)
- Wisdom for Singers and Philosophers ISBN 978-1532042591 (2018)

== Videography ==
- Ultimate Voice Builder Kit (2013)
