= Bea Ballard =

British television executive producer

Bea Ballard (also known professionally as Beatrice Ballard) is a British television executive producer. She is chief executive of 10 Star Entertainment, a production company set up in 2009 with investment from Fremantle. She is the daughter of novelist J. G. Ballard.

Ballard co-devised several Saturday night entertainment programmes for BBC One, including How Do You Solve a Problem Like Maria? and Any Dream Will Do while creative head and executive producer at BBC Entertainment between 2003 and 2007.

== Television career ==
Ballard started her television career at the BBC, on John Craven's Newsround, where she worked as a journalist and assistant producer. She worked at London Weekend Television in entertainment where she produced a range of shows including the An Audience... specials (with Peter Ustinov and Billy Connolly, among others), The Late Clive James, Michael Aspel and Company and the BAFTA Awards show. David Liddiment then invited Ballard to join BBC Entertainment as Head of Talk and Specials. This led to her devising a number of event specials.

She devised the Clive James weekly entertainment show Saturday Night Clive. Following its success on BBC2, the show transferred to BBC One.. Ballard also produced the majority of Clive James' other output for the BBC. She devised and produced the eight part documentary series Fame in the Twentieth Century a co-production with PBS, shown both in the UK and the US. Ballard also produced Clive James's Postcard from... (1990–94). She also created and executive produced many specials for BBC One and oversaw all of the BBC's Eurovision programming.

While Creative Head of BBC Entertainment Events, Ballard put forward to the Controller of BBC One, Peter Fincham, the idea of How Do You Solve a Problem Like Maria?. The programme was the first time that a West End musical had been cast via a television show, with the public voting on contestants drawn from open auditions. The format has been adapted internationally for a number of other musicals.

Ballard also worked with Stephen Fry on Weekend for BBC Four. The weekend included the documentary 50 Not Out, and the programme Guilty. She helped to persuade Ronnie Barker to come out of retirement and reunite with Ronnie Corbett to make The Two Ronnies Sketchbook series.

Ballard re-launched the Parkinson chat show hosted by Michael Parkinson for BBC One.

== Chairman of BAFTA Television Committee ==
Ballard was elected Chairman of the BAFTA Television Committee, and served from 2001 to 2003. Prior to this position, she was elected to BAFTA Council and served for six years. She was also Chairman of the BAFTA Events Committee for two years, producing a number of keynote speeches with channel controllers and she launched The Independent View – a series of interviews and profiles of the television industry's leading independents. During her tenure at BAFTA, she expanded its television programming through the development of the BAFTA Tributes series. She also oversaw annually the television juries and chaired many herself, ranging from drama to comedy.

== Ballard programmes for BBC One ==
- The Sound of Musicals
- Any Dream Will Do (Joseph)
- How Do You Solve A Problem Like Maria (Best Entertainment Series – International Emmys 2007; Broadcast Awards 2007; Royal Television Society Awards 2007)
- Celebrate the Sound of Music (hosted by Graham Norton)
- Parkinson (Best Ent Series 4 years running at National TV Awards; Best Ent Series BAFTA TV Awards; Best Ent Series RTS Awards; Best Ent Series TV Quick Awards)
- The Two Ronnies Sketchbook (highest rating BBC comedy series of 2005)
- The BAFTA TV Awards
- BAFTA Tributes to Victoria Wood, Judi Dench, Billy Connolly, Bruce Forsyth, Ronnie Barker, Julie Walters, James Bond
- Eurovision
- Making Your Mind Up (later rebranded Song For Europe)
- Eastenders Christmas Party
- One Night With Robbie Williams - Royal Albert Hall (Silver Rose for Best International Music Prog at Golden Rose of Montreux)
- One Night With Rod Stewart (Royal Albert Hall)
- Elton John – an Ivor Novello Tribute
- Elton John at the Royal Opera House
- All Time Greatest Love Songs
- The Royal Variety Show
- Victoria Wood's Sketch Show Story
- The Sitcom Story with Dawn French
- Ruby Wax Meets Madonna
- Carrie Fisher on Hollywood (Emmy award)
- Auntie's All Time Greats
- Saturday Night Clive (BAFTA and RTS nominated)
- Clive James Fame in the Twentieth Century (Emmy Award)
- Clive James's Postcard from... Paris; New York; Miami; Paris
