= Grease Is the Word =

UK TV Series

- Genre: Reality
- Created by: Simon Cowell
- Presented by: Zoe Ball
- Judges: Brian Friedman; David Gest; David Ian; Sinitta (2007)
- Country of origin: United Kingdom
- Original language: English
- No. of series: 1
- No. of episodes: 10

Production
- Running time: 60–90mins (inc. adverts)
- Production company: SYCOtv in association with Talkback Thames

Original release
- Network: ITV
- Release: 7 April – 9 June 2007

Related
- Grease: You're the One That I Want!

Grease Is the Word is the United Kingdom version of NBC's Grease: You're the One That I Want!. It aired during 2007, and was produced by Syco TV (the production company of Simon Cowell). The winning couple, Susan McFadden and Danny Bayne, went on to star in a long-running West End production of Grease at the Piccadilly Theatre.

== Production ==
The judges were actor and theatre producer David Ian, concert promoter and media personality David Gest, former popstar and television personality Sinitta, and choreographer and former The X Factor judge Brian Friedman. The main ITV show was presented by Zoe Ball, and Holly Willoughby presented Greased Lightnin on ITV2. Greased Lightnin shows extra unseen auditions, behind the scenes gossip and exclusive interviews with the judges and contestants.

Cat Deeley was originally scheduled to present the show, but had to pull out at the last minute due to scheduling difficulties with her American shows. Simon Cowell was also supposed to be a judge on the show but could not as it was shown at the same time as American Idol where he was contracted to appear as a judge. He was still an executive producer.

Unlike the NBC series, the ITV programme was not based (at least directly) on the How Do You Solve a Problem Like Maria? format, which is owned by the BBC.

== Format ==
After the traditional auditions, the final sixteen were paired up. From show four onwards each couple had to sing a duet, based on a theme. The two couples who gained the fewest votes, each week, had to sing again, this time a 'Grease' classic. The judges then eliminated one of those two couples.

After three couples had been eliminated, the judges changed the couples, eliminating again one of the two lowest vote getting couples.

The following two weeks, were the Danny and Sandy semi-finals, respectively, with the singers competing as soloists, with the judges eliminating the first and the viewers the second victim of the nights. The final consisted with the final two Dannys and Sandys, with the public voting which two should win the roles.

== Original couples ==
- Tom & Kate
- Richard & Joanna
- Wayne & Hayley
- Bradley & Michelle
- Danny R & Lauren
- Danny B & Susan McFadden
- Anthony & Allison
- Michael & Vicky

== Finalists ==
Couple/Act	Date of Elimination/Winning	Decided by
Susan McFadden (24)	WINNER	Viewers
Danny Bayne (19)	WINNER	Viewers
Anthony Kavanagh (a.k.a. Kavana) (29)	9 June	Viewers
Michelle Antrobus (24)	9 June	Viewers
Vicky Hoyles (22)	2 June	Viewers
Alison Crawford (25)	2 June	Judges
Michael Quinn (24)	26 May	Viewers
Danny Rhodes (22)	26 May	Judges
Bradley Clarkson (25) & Lauren McConnell (16)	19 May	Viewers
Wayne Smith (26) & Hayley Clarke (18)	12 May	Viewers
Richard Morgan (20) & Joanna Power (22)	5 May	Viewers
Tom Bradley (19) & Kate Somerset-How (23)	28 April	Viewers

== Reception ==
=== Ratings ===
Episode	UK Air Date	Timeslot	Viewers (millions)	Weekly Rank
1	7 April 2007	18:05	4.13	20
2	14 April 2007	18:40	4.47	20
3	21 April 2007	19:30	4.48	19
4	28 April 2007	19:30	3.87	21
5	5 May 2007	19:45	4.15	20
6	12 May 2007	19:50	4.66	21
7	19 May 2007	20:00	4.50	20
8	26 May 2007	19:55	3.96	19
9	2 June 2007	19:55	4.16	20
10	9 June 2007	19:55	4.31	15

=== Controversy ===
David Ian gathered the finalists at the Piccadilly Theatre in London's West End to tell them that the judges "hadn't got it right with the pairs."

On the fourth live show, David Ian announced live on the programme that from week five, the finalists would no longer be partnered up. The Danny hopefuls would compete against each other, live on week five's show, and the Sandy's on week six of the show. Each of the Danny and Sandy specials eliminated 2 of the 4 hopefuls thus leaving only 4 finalists for the final vote on 9 June.

== Dutch version ==
A similar format has been used as well in The Netherlands in 2022, with the show Op zoek naar Danny & Sandy (Looking for Danny & Sandy) taking 2 unknown singers and placing the winners in the 2 lead roles for the 2023 performance of Grease in The Netherlands. On 3 February 2023, Tristan van der Lingen and Danique Graanoogst were announced the winners of the show.
