= Helena Blackman =

British musical theatre actress (born 1982)

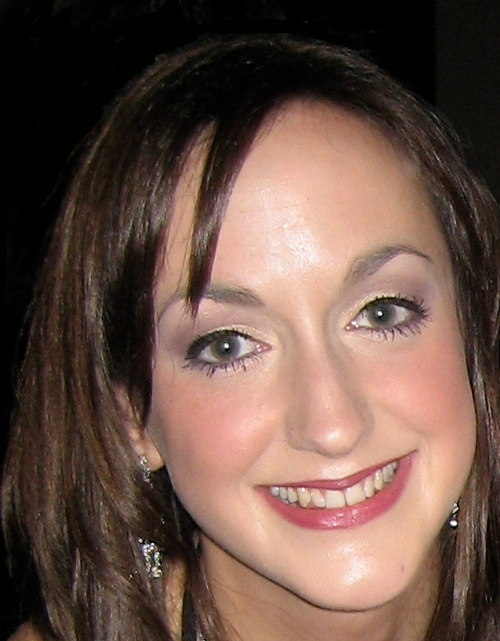

Background information
- Born: 10 December 1982 (age 43)
- Origin: Southampton, England
- Genres: Pop, Musicals, Theatre
- Instrument: Singing
- Years active: 2006 – present
- Website: www.helenablackman.com

Helena Blackman (born 10 December 1982 in Southampton) is a British musical theatre actress, best known for being the runner-up in the hit BBC1 Reality TV programme How Do You Solve A Problem Like Maria?.

She trained at the Guildford School of Acting.

== Biography ==
On 29 October 2006, Blackman was seen as Gypsy Rose Lee in a production of Gypsy which was performed at the Wales Millennium Centre as part of the Cardiff International Festival of Musical Theatre. In December 2006, Blackman played Dorothy in an acclaimed run of The Wizard of Oz at the Haymarket Theatre in Leicester.

Blackman is a cabaret performer at corporate events, she has been featured as a soloist in The Night of a Thousand Voices at the Royal Albert Hall and in Tim McArthur's one-man show Sister Mary McArthur Comin' At-Cha! at the Jermyn Street Theatre in London.

In May 2007, Blackman was seen mentoring contestant Ben Ellis in an episode of Any Dream Will Do and in July 2007 she appeared as a soloist on BBC Radio 2's long-running Friday Night is Music Night opposite Daniel Boys. Blackman toured the UK extensively as the lead role of "Nellie Forbush" in a successful run of Rodgers and Hammerstein's South Pacific from 2007 - 2008.

On Christmas Eve 2007, Blackman performed with Lee Mead and Connie Fisher and some of the other 'Maria' and 'Joseph' finalists in a BBC special 'festive' reunion show called When Joseph met Maria! - celebrating both the hit Andrew Lloyd Webber BBC shows - it was recorded earlier on 2 December 2007. The BBC show, HDYSAPLM, featuring Blackman, won an international Emmy Award in New York (2007) for best non-scripted entertainment.

From 10 February - 14 March 2009, Helena Blackman played the lead role of Helen in Stephen Sondheim's Saturday Night at the Jermyn Street Theatre in London.

On 14 February 2011, Blackman released her debut album, The Sound of Rodgers & Hammerstein, consisting of classic Rodgers and Hammerstein material, as well as some of their lesser known songs.

From 5 to 31 December 2011, Blackman appeared in the title role of Snow White at the Redditch Palace Theatre.

From September 2013 to May 2014 she played the leading role of Milly in Seven Brides for Seven Brothers on the UK and Ireland tour.

From 7 to 20 August 2017 Blackman starred alongside Daniel Boys and Sherman Brothers' musical scion, composer Robert J. Sherman in A Spoonful of Sherman at "Live At Zedel" in London.

In April 2023, she appeared in an episode of the BBC soap opera Doctors as Helen Macdonald.

== Reviews ==
Blackman has been reviewed by several print and web publications. The Times' Jeremy Kingston said of her performance in The Wizard of Oz "Helena Blackman's voice soars to the yearning high notes, and yet she is not afraid to sing in the softest whisper. Every word is clear and cuts to the heart." Alfred Hickling of The Guardian also gave Blackman praise in the role saying "She gives a sparklingly assured performance, marred only by the usual drawback of appearing at least 20 years too old for a pinafore dress."

The Stage said of her performance as Nellie Forbrush in South Pacific "...she exudes enthusiasm in the....numbers - especially the excellent Thanksgiving Follies scenes - and she looks perfectly 1940s." BBC Nottingham's Heather Hinchley also reviewed Blackman's performance positively saying "Without a doubt the star of the show was Helena Blackman".
