= David Ian =

English theatre producer and actor (born 1961)

David Ian (born David Ian Lane; February 1961) is a British theatre producer and former actor and singer. He is the recipient of five Olivier Awards and four Tony nominations. David is Chief Executive Officer of Crossroads Live Group.

== Biography ==
Ian started out as an actor and appeared in a number of UK theatre productions, including the musicals The Pirates of Penzance, Joseph and the Amazing Technicolor Dreamcoat, and The Rocky Horror Show. He is known professionally as David Ian as the name David Lane was already taken when he applied to the actors union Equity. As a singer, Ian twice attempted to represent the UK at the Eurovision Song Contest, taking part in both the 1984 and 1986 A Song for Europe competitions on BBC1 as a member of the bands First Division and Jump respectively.

== Producer ==
In 2006, he founded David Ian Productions, based in London's Covent Garden. Prior to founding DIP, he was Chairman/CEO of the global theatrical division of Live Nation (from 2005) having joined the group when it was part of Clear Channel Entertainment (in 2000).

At Live Nation, he was responsible for Broadway Across America, which produces and tours first class Broadway shows in over 40 markets in the United States and Canada. He was simultaneously CEO of the UK division which included over 25 theatres both in London's West End and the majority of the regional markets in the UK.

== How Do You Solve A Problem Like Maria? ==
In 2006, David Ian and Andrew Lloyd Webber agreed to co-produce a production of The Sound of Music. Together with the BBC they created the original TV casting show How Do You Solve a Problem like Maria?, hosted by Graham Norton. Ian, along with Lloyd Webber, was a judge on the programme. The TV show was a resounding success and led to the launch of The Sound of Music as a smash hit, starring Connie Fisher at the London Palladium.

== Credits ==
His credits include Grease, Saturday Night Fever, The King and I, West Side Story, Singin’ in the Rain, Ain’t Misbehavin’, Anything Goes, The Producers, Defending the Caveman, Guys and Dolls, Daisy Pulls it Off, The Sound of Music, La Cage aux Folles, Sweet Charity, Flashdance, Gypsy, The Shawshank Redemption, The Phantom of the Opera, My Fair Lady, Evita, Chess, The Rocky Horror Show, Cats, Dr Dolittle, Starlight Express, Seminar, Steel Magnolias, Ghost the Musical, Priscilla Queen of the Desert, The Bodyguard, Jersey Boys, Annie, Xanadu, Show Boat, The Secret Diary of Adrian Mole, Sunset Boulevard, Scrooge, Quartet, Benidorm Live, Magic Mike Live, Waitress, School of Rock, The Drifters Girl, 42nd Street, Jesus Christ Superstar, Love Never Dies, Chitty Chitty Bang Bang and Mean Girls.
