= Zoë Tyler =

English singer, actress

Zoe Tyler
- Also known as: Zoe Kindley
- Born: Zoe Tyler; 7 July 1970 (age 56); Birmingham, West Midlands, England
- Genres: All genres
- Occupations: Voice coach, performer, singer agent
- Instrument: Singing
- Years active: 1990–present
- Website: zoetylerinternational.com

Zoë Tyler (born 7 July 1970) is an English singer, actress, voice coach, West End performer, and reality television show judge. She is also a soloist with the Royal Philharmonic Orchestra.

== Early career ==
Tyler was born in Birmingham and educated at Primrose Hill Secondary School in Kings Norton. Tyler's career began when she joined the cast of Les Misérables at the age of 20. She followed by joining the touring cast of Jesus Christ Superstar, followed by the award-winning City of Angels in which she was part of the jazz singing quartet. After a sabbatical from West End musicals Tyler returned and joined the long-running musical Fame as the dance teacher. She also played a part in the soap Doctors which is filmed in Birmingham.

As a recording artist, Tyler has sung on numerous artists' albums, including Michael Ball and Cliff Richard. Tyler also sang back-up vocals for Elton John, Barry Manilow and Donna Summer as well as Rod Stewart, Will Young, k.d. lang and Bonnie Tyler.

== Television career ==
Tyler first appeared on television as an 18 year old singer on the BBC 1 talent show, Bob Says Opportunity Knocks on 3 March 1989. Tyler appeared on BBC One's How Do You Solve A Problem Like Maria? during the summer and autumn of 2006. The following year she was a judge on the follow-up series Any Dream Will Do.

Tyler joined Loose Women on ITV. in 2007.

In September and October 2008, Tyler was a judge on Hairspray: The School Musical. The next year she then reappeared in Grease: The School Musical. Since April 2009, Tyler has been coaching young contestants on the Disney Channel UK talent show My Camp Rock. She also found the time to make a personal appearance for Top Hat Stage School at "Top Hat at the Palladium" on 18 July 2010, which was a show to raise awareness for Breakthrough Breast Cancer.

In December 2011, she was a vocal coach on Daybreak. In 2018, Tyler was a world expert on CBS on the TV talent show The Worlds Best.
