= Connie Fisher =

British actress, singer and TV presenter (born 1983)

- Born: 17 June 1983 (age 43); Lisburn, Northern Ireland, United Kingdom
- Genres: Pop, musicals
- Instrument: Singing
- Years active: 2006–present
- Website: www.conniefisher.co.uk

Connie Fisher (born 17 June 1983) is a British actress, singer and TV presenter from Lisburn, Northern Ireland, who won How Do You Solve a Problem Like Maria?, a talent contest on BBC One.

On 15 November 2006, she opened to excellent reviews in the part of Maria von Trapp in The Sound of Music in the West End, London on a six-month contract, which was extended until 23 February 2008. She resumed the role of Maria in The Sound of Music UK tour starting in July 2009. She had a recurring role as a patient in the long-running BBC medical drama series Casualty in 2012.

== Early life ==
Fisher was born in Lisburn, the daughter of a major in the Royal Corps of Signals who was stationed in Northern Ireland during The Troubles. Her father's job took the family all over the United Kingdom: first to Dorset, England, where Fisher lived until the age of four, then to a village near Haverfordwest, Wales. She attended Hayscastle Junior School, and then went on to Sir Thomas Picton School. She is a fluent Welsh speaker.

During her teenage years she was a member of Haverfordwest Operatic Society where she performed in The Pirates of Penzance and played Nellie Forbush in South Pacific. She was also a member of the Torch Youth Theatre where she performed in Georg Büchner's play Woyzeck. She successfully became a member of National Youth Music Theatre (1999–2002), where she played the Lady of the Lake in the UK tour of Pendragon, and played the lead role, Morgan Le Fay, when the production toured Japan in 2001.

From an early age Fisher was a member of Côr Newyddion Da (English translation – "Good News Choir"), which introduced her to the Eisteddfodic field and encouraged her to perform as a soloist. She competed annually in the Urdd Gobaith Cymru, National and International Eisteddfods. In 2002 Fisher won the Wilbert Lloyd Roberts Scholarship in the National Eisteddfod "Songs from the Shows" competition and the Milford and West Wales Mercury talent competition.

Fisher received her professional vocational training at the Mountview Academy of Theatre Arts, winning a Dance and Drama Award to have her training fully funded by the Government. She graduated in 2005 with a First Class BA Hons degree in Musical Theatre, as well as the Gyearbuor Asante prize for the highest score. At Mountview she performed in Annie Get Your Gun, A…my name is Alice, Jerry's Girls and played Julie Jordan in Carousel.

== Career ==
=== Early career ===
Fisher made television appearances on Jane McDonald's Star for a Night when she was sixteen; Owen Money's Just Up Your Street, and BBC Children in Need. She also recorded a Welsh song called Curiad Calon (Heartbeat) which was released on the compilation album Cân i Gymru (A Song for Wales). She released a charity single for the Noah's Ark Appeal entitled 'Eyes of a Child'.

Fisher's first professional theatre appearance was at Milford Haven's Torch Theatre, Christmas 2005, where she played Princess Samina in a pantomime of Aladdin. She then took the £1,000 cash prize and the Gower Trophy in the Welsh Musical Theatre Young Singer of the Year Competition in 2006. Before being cast as Maria, she worked in media telesales, whilst auditioning for West End parts but failing to get cast.

=== Maria: 2006–2008 ===
Fisher came to prominence on winning the 2006 BBC One talent contest How Do You Solve a Problem Like Maria?. In early March 2007, she was ordered by her doctor to take two weeks' rest from The Sound of Music, after straining her vocal cords singing through a cold. On her return to the show, it was announced that Fisher would be reducing her workload to six shows a week, with Maria being played in the Monday evening and Wednesday matinee shows by Aoife Mulholland, one of the runners-up in How Do You Solve A Problem Like Maria?.

On 1 July 2007, Fisher performed alongside artists including Sarah Brightman, Josh Groban, Donny Osmond and Andrea Bocelli in Lloyd Webber's segment of the Concert for Diana at London's Wembley Stadium in front of 63,000 people. She also appeared at Bryn Terfel's Faenol Festival during the August bank holiday weekend, 2007. She also featured on the 50th Anniversary studio recording of West Side Story, singing "Somewhere". In October 2007, she won the 2007 lastminute.com People's Choice Theatre Award for Favourite Theatre Actress. She was also awarded the whatsonstage.com Theatregoers Choice Award for London Newcomer of the Year.

On 24 December 2007, Fisher performed with Lee Mead and some of the other Maria and Any Dream finalists in a BBC special 'festive' reunion show called When Joseph met Maria! – celebrating both the hit Andrew Lloyd Webber BBC shows – it was recorded earlier on 2 December 2007. The BBC show, How Do You Solve A Problem Like Maria?, featuring Fisher, won an Emmy Award in New York (2007) for best non-scripted entertainment.

=== Post-Maria: 2008–2011 ===
Fisher ended her run as Maria on 23 February 2008. Fisher was soon co-starring with Alistair McGowan in a revival of the musical They're Playing Our Song at the Menier Chocolate Factory. Also, in November Fisher appeared in concerts at Truro Cathedral and at the Great Fosters Hotel in Surrey. In December 2008, Fisher appeared with her mother in an episode of Bargain Hunt, Famous Finds. She also starred in her first TV drama. Caught in a Trap aired on ITV1 in it she plays a young woman with an Elvis Presley obsession.

Fisher's second solo album, Secret Love, was released on 23 February 2009. In April her "Secret Love" UK Tour was cancelled in order for her to undergo an operation on her vocal cords. She suffers from "congenital fusion anomalies". Between Monday 1 June and Friday 5 June 2009, Fisher guest presented the Scottish lifestyle show The Hour, alongside the show's main host Stephen Jardine. The UK tour of The Sound of Music, starring Fisher, began previews in Cardiff on 26 July 2009.

=== Voice problems: 2011–present ===
In 2011 Fisher was diagnosed with congenital sulcus vocalis (holes in her vocal cords). This seriously affected her singing and general speaking voice, which she described as sounding "like Marge Simpson". After three operations in Boston, MA, Fisher was told she would never sing again and stopped singing professionally. In 2015, she met voice builder Gary Catona, who offered to help her sing again. The process was filmed as a documentary, Connie Fisher: I'll Sing Once More, and broadcast on BBC1 in July 2015.

Since 2011 Fisher has since expanded on her TV work, presenting Songs of Praise and the BBC Cardiff Singer of the World competition, and established the Connie Fisher Academy, which trains aspiring performers in musical theatre. In 2013, Fisher joined TV production company Avanti Media, and presently works there as a development producer.

Fisher has also developed her acting roles, undertaking a recurring role as patient Amanda in the BBC One medical drama series Casualty. She first appeared as a patient in early 2012, and returned as the same character in a recurring role later in the year. She left the show on 1 December 2012. In 2012 she played Ruth in the UK Tour revival of Wonderful Town opposite Michael Xavier.

In 2018, Fisher was one of three Welsh judges (alongside Tara Bethan and Stifyn Parri) on the panel of Junior Eurovision: Chwilio am Seren (English: Search for a Star), a singing competition organised by Rondo Media and broadcast on S4C, to select an entrant aged 9–14 to participate in the Junior Eurovision Song Contest 2018, representing Wales.

== Personal life ==
Fisher married banker Jeremy Reed in 2010. They live in Barry.

In August 2009, Fisher was made a member of the Gorsedd at the 2009 National Eisteddfod in Bala, Gwynedd.

== Discography ==
=== Favourite Things ===
On 9 October 2006, Fisher released her debut album, Favourite Things which featured the following track listing:

1. "Maybe This Time"
2. "Natural Woman"
3. "Dance the Dance"
4. "Diamonds Are a Girl's Best Friend"
5. "No Matter What"
6. "Shout"
7. "All the Love I Have"
8. "All That Jazz" (With Helena Blackman and Siobhan Dillon)
9. "Another Suitcase in Another Hall"
10. "As Long As He Needs Me"
11. "The Sound of Music Suite – Entr'Acte"
12. "The Sound of Music Suite – My Favourite Things"
13. "The Sound of Music Suite – Something Good"

[It reached No. 14 on the UK Album chart]

=== The Sound of Music – London Palladium cast album ===
On 11 December 2006, the soundtrack to the new production of The Sound of Music, featuring Connie Fisher, Lesley Garrett and the cast of the production, was released, produced by Andrew Lloyd Webber and Nigel Wright for Really Useful Records.

=== Secret Love ===
On 23 February 2009, Fisher released her second solo album, Secret Love, which features the following track listing:

1. 'I Could Have Danced All Night'
2. 'Secret Love'
3. 'Next Time You Fall in Love' (featuring Lee Mead)
4. 'True Love Ways'
5. 'When She Loved Me'
6. 'I Guess I'll Miss the Man'
7. 'You Must Love Me'
8. 'Someone To Watch Over Me'
9. 'Make Up My Heart'
10. 'If I Ever Fall in Love Again'
11. 'Memory'
12. 'If Love Were All'
13. 'First Impression Counts'
