= Over the Rainbow (2010 TV series) =

2010 British television series

- Genre: Reality
- Directed by: Simon Staffurth
- Presented by: Graham Norton
- Judges: Andrew Lloyd Webber; Charlotte Church; John Partridge; Sheila Hancock
- Country of origin: United Kingdom
- Original language: English
- No. of series: 1
- No. of episodes: 18

Production
- Executive producer: Suzy Lamb
- Producer: Mel Balac
- Production location: Fountain Studios
- Running time: 40–90 minutes
- Production company: Talkback Thames

Original release
- Network: BBC One, BBC HD
- Release: 26 March – 22 May 2010

Related
- I'd Do Anything (2008); Superstar (2012)

Over the Rainbow is a British television talent series that aired on BBC One from 26 March to 22 May 2010. It documented the search for a new, undiscovered musical theatre performer to play the role of Dorothy Gale in Andrew Lloyd Webber's 2011 stage production of the 1939 film The Wizard of Oz and a dog to play Toto for a one-off performance.

Produced by Talkback Thames for the BBC, the series was presented by Graham Norton. It followed previous collaborations between the BBC and Lloyd Webber to find new musical theatre performers: How Do You Solve a Problem Like Maria?, Any Dream Will Do and I'd Do Anything. The series was named after the song "Over the Rainbow" and was also aired by TV3 in Ireland.

Following a public telephone vote, 18-year-old Danielle Hope was crowned the winner of the series and was chosen to play Dorothy. Miniature Schnauzer Dangerous Dave was chosen to play Toto.

A Canadian version of the show aired on CBC Television in the autumn of 2012.

== Format ==
=== Creation ===
Following the end of I'd Do Anything in 2008, Lloyd Webber announced he would not work on another talent show in 2009, so that he could work on the musical Love Never Dies, the sequel to The Phantom of the Opera, but that he would, however, return in 2010 to find a performer to play Dorothy Gale for a production of The Wizard of Oz. In July 2009, it was reported that the 2010 series had been dropped and would not take place until at least 2011, so that Lloyd Webber would not be criticised for promoting Love Never Dies, and that the series would be taken to commercial broadcaster ITV. Lloyd Webber later said that it was a scheduling clash solved by moving the series to later in the year.

The BBC announced the commission of the series in September 2009 with the title The Wizard of Oz; it would search for a performer, cast by the public, to play Dorothy and a dog to play Toto. Following the announcement, Lloyd Webber told The Daily Telegraph:

A big sticking point for me, this was. This is what the BBC wanted and I had to point out to them that as a cat man, this was not something that I was very happy about at all. The whole thing fills me with extreme concern. I might insist on having a cat on the programme, because I think the BBC as a public service broadcaster have got to give equal time in my view to cats.

=== Judges ===
A panel of judges assessed the contestants during the series. They were:

- Andrew Lloyd Webber – musical theatre composer and producer, co-producer of the new stage production
- Charlotte Church – singer - confirmed as replacement for Denise Van Outen
- John Partridge – musical theatre performer and EastEnders actor - replaced John Barrowman
- Sheila Hancock – television and stage actress - replaced Barry Humphries

The Daily Mail reported that Denise van Outen, a judge during previous series, had been dropped due to her pregnancy, however this was denied by the BBC. John Barrowman, also a judge for previous series, wanted to judge on the series and he says the BBC wanted him to do it. However, he was already planning to star in American series Desperate Housewives when Talkback Thames asked him, and he turned down the offer.

=== Auditions ===
Applications for the series were solicited in November 2009 and auditions took place in Belfast, Cardiff, Glasgow, Manchester and London from January 2010.

110 auditionees were invited to the callbacks at the Hackney Empire in London, where they performed in front of Hancock, Partridge and casting director David Grindrod. The group was then narrowed down to 50, and later increased to 54 when four eliminated contestants (including Jessica Robinson and Stephanie Fearon) were brought back into the competition. The final 54 were invited to attend 'Dorothy Farm', where they received vocal, choreography and acting classes before performing in front of Church, Partridge and Hancock. The panel then selected 20 girls to move on to the final round of auditions.

The top 20 performed in front of Lloyd Webber and the panel in a live show for a place in the final 10. The panel selected the final 10, with the public selecting one of the 10 contestants not chosen by the panel (Emilie Fleming) as the wildcard and eleventh finalist.

=== Live finals ===
The final eleven contestants competed in the live studio finals each Saturday from 3 April, with the results being announced in a pre-recorded results show on Sunday. Each week the contestants performed, receiving comments from the judges following their performance. The public would then get the chance to vote for their favourite Dorothy, and the two Dorothys with the fewest votes performed in a sing-off in front of Lloyd Webber during the results show. He would then decide which potential Dorothy to keep in the contest. To end the programme, the surviving Dorothys sang "We Thank You Very Sweetly", a verse from "Ding-Dong! The Witch Is Dead", while the leaving Dorothy handed her shoes to the saved Dorothy, who gave them to Lloyd Webber. The eliminated Dorothy would then lead a performance of "Over the Rainbow" whilst carried on a crescent moon across the stage.

The live shows took place in the Fountain Studios in London. Profits from viewer votes went to the BBC Performing Arts Fund.

== Toto ==
The series searched for a dog to play Toto for a one-off performance. The search was led by Jodie Prenger, winner of I'd Do Anything, along with dog trainer Gerry Cott and animal behaviour expert Sarah Fisher. The final 5 dogs were revealed on Sunday, 25 April.

Final 5
Dog	Age*	Breed	Colour	Owner	Status
Troy	4½	Cross-breed	Lime green	Jackie	Eliminated
Spider	5	Beagle	Purple	Lucy	Eliminated
Missy	3	Cross-breed	Pink	Anna	Eliminated
Eddie	1	Pug/Shih Tzu	Silver	Lucie	Eliminated
"Dangerous" Dave	1	Miniature Schnauzer	Blue	Rachel	Winner

*at start of series

== Contestants ==
Twenty contestants made it through the first audition rounds and performed in the first live show. Ten of them were selected as finalists by the judging panel, while Emilie Fleming was selected as the wildcard and eleventh contestant following the public vote after the final audition round. Each finalist wore a unique coloured dress and silver slippers with bows on them which matched the dress. At the end of every live show, the losing Dorothy would have her shoes stripped by the Dorothy who survived the sing-off, and the shoes would be given to Lloyd Webber. The winner of the series, Danielle Hope, claimed a pair of ruby slippers as her prize, as well as the starring role. Sophie Evans, the runner-up of the series, would later become the alternate Dorothy.

=== Semi-finalists ===
Contestant	Age	From
Tegan Edwards	17	Norfolk
Tasheka Coe	28	Wolverhampton
Sarah Middleton	21	Derby
Philippa O'Hara	23	Belfast
Katie Honan	19	Republic of Ireland
Emma Warren	20	Dublin
Claire Hillier	25	Wales
Claire Harbourne	18	Lancashire
Camille Mesnard	21	Merseyside

=== Finalists ===
Contestant	Age	From	Dress colour	Status
Amy Diamond	22	Cheshire	Lavender	Eliminated 1st in Week 1
Bronte Barbe	18	Macclesfield	Bubble gum pink	Eliminated 2nd in Week 2
Danielle "Dani" Rayner	16	Cheshire	Olive green	Eliminated 3rd in Week 3
Emilie Fleming	19	Newcastle	Black	Eliminated 4th in Week 4
Stephanie Davis	17	Liverpool	Acid yellow	Eliminated 5th in Week 5
Jenny Douglas	18	Edinburgh	Burgundy	Eliminated 6th in Week 6
Jessica Robinson	18	Middlesbrough	Emerald green	Eliminated 7th in Week 6
Steph Fearon	21	London	Golden	Eliminated 8th in Week 7
Lauren Samuels	22	London	Cerise	Eliminated 9th in Week 8
Sophie Evans	17	Wales	Purple	Runner-up
Danielle Hope	17	Greater Manchester	Red	Winner

*at start of series

=== Results summary ===
Colour key

–	Contestant was in the bottom two and who was saved after the sing off
–	Contestant was eliminated after the sing off
–	Contestant won Over the Rainbow

Weekly results per contestant
Contestant	Week 1	Week 2	Week 3	Week 4	Week 5	Week 6		Week 7	Week 8	
Contestant	Week 1	Week 2	Week 3	Week 4	Week 5	Part 1	Part 2	Week 7	Part 1	Part 2
Danielle Hope	Safe	Safe	8th	Safe	Safe	Safe	4th	Safe	Safe	Winner (week 8)
Sophie Evans	Safe	Safe	Safe	7th	Safe	Safe	Safe	Safe	Safe	Runner-up (week 8)
Lauren Samuels	Safe	9th	Safe	Safe	Safe	6th	Safe	3rd	3rd	Eliminated (week 8)
Steph Fearon	10th	Safe	Safe	Safe	6th	Safe	Safe	4th	Eliminated (week 7)	
Jessica Robinson	Safe	Safe	Safe	Safe	Safe	Safe	5th	Eliminated (week 6)		
Jenny Douglas	Safe	Safe	Safe	Safe	Safe	5th	Eliminated (week 6)			
Stephanie Davis	Safe	Safe	Safe	Safe	7th	Eliminated (week 5)				
Emilie Fleming	Safe	Safe	Safe	8th	Eliminated (week 4)					
Dani Rayner	Safe	Safe	9th	Eliminated (week 3)						
Bronte Barbe	Safe	10th	Eliminated (week 2)							
Amy Diamond	11th	Eliminated (week 1)								

== Episodes ==
=== Auditions: Top 20 selection ===
The series started on Friday, 26 March, and the first programme followed the open auditions, call-backs and the contestants at 'Dorothy Farm', concluding with the selection of the top 20.

=== Auditions: Top 10 selection ===
Aired on Saturday, 27 March, the second episode saw the top 20 contestants perform in front of the panel to secure a place in the top 10. In groups of four, they performed a pop song and a musical song, coached by a West End performer. The show performances were:

- Group performances:
  - "Yellow Brick Road / We're Off to See the Wizard" (from The Wizard of Oz)
- Top 20 Performances

==== Group 1 ====
Act	Songs	Results
Camille Mesnard	"Never Forget You" (pop song) & "All That Jazz" from Chicago with coaching from Ruthie Henshall (Musical Song)	Eliminated
Jessica Robinson	"Never Forget You" (pop song) & "All That Jazz" from Chicago with coaching from Ruthie Henshall (Musical Song)	Advanced
Stephanie Davis	"Never Forget You" (pop song) & "All That Jazz" from Chicago with coaching from Ruthie Henshall (Musical Song)	Advanced
Sophie Evans	"Never Forget You" (pop song) & "All That Jazz" from Chicago with coaching from Ruthie Henshall (Musical Song)	Advanced

==== Group 2 ====
Act	Songs	Results
Takesha Coe	"Love Story" (pop song) & "Tell Me It's Not True" from Blood Brothers, with coaching from Melanie Chisholm (Musical Song)	Eliminated
Dani Rayner	"Love Story" (pop song) & "Tell Me It's Not True" from Blood Brothers, with coaching from Melanie Chisholm (Musical Song)	Advanced
Philippa O'Hara	"Love Story" (pop song) & "Tell Me It's Not True" from Blood Brothers, with coaching from Melanie Chisholm (Musical Song)	Eliminated
Sarah Middleton	"Love Story" (pop song) & "Tell Me It's Not True" from Blood Brothers, with coaching from Melanie Chisholm (Musical Song)	Eliminated

==== Group 3 ====
Act	Songs	Results
Emma Warren	"Cry Me Out" (pop song) & "Somebody to Love" from We Will Rock You, with coaching from Kerry Ellis (Musical Song)	Eliminated
Steph Fearon	"Cry Me Out" (pop song) & "Somebody to Love" from We Will Rock You, with coaching from Kerry Ellis (Musical Song)	Advanced
Jenny Douglas	"Cry Me Out" (pop song) & "Somebody to Love" from We Will Rock You, with coaching from Kerry Ellis (Musical Song)	Advanced
Tegan Edwards	"Cry Me Out" (pop song) & "Somebody to Love" from We Will Rock You, with coaching from Kerry Ellis (Musical Song)	Eliminated

==== Group 4 ====
Act	Songs	Results
Katie Honan	"Rain on Your Parade" (pop song) & "Legally Blonde" from the musical of the same name, with coaching from Sheridan Smith (Musical Song)	Eliminated
Bronte Barbe	"Rain on Your Parade" (pop song) & "Legally Blonde" from the musical of the same name, with coaching from Sheridan Smith (Musical Song)	Advanced
Lauren Samuels	"Rain on Your Parade" (pop song) & "Legally Blonde" from the musical of the same name, with coaching from Sheridan Smith (Musical Song)	Advanced
Claire Harbourne	"Rain on Your Parade" (pop song) & "Legally Blonde" from the musical of the same name, with coaching from Sheridan Smith (Musical Song)	Eliminated

==== Group 5 ====
Act	Songs	Results
Amy Diamond	"Take a Bow" (pop song) & "If My Friends Could See Me Now" from Sweet Charity, with coaching from Tamzin Outhwaite (Musical Song)	Advanced
Danielle Hope	"Take a Bow" (pop song) & "If My Friends Could See Me Now" from Sweet Charity, with coaching from Tamzin Outhwaite (Musical Song)	Advanced
Emilie Fleming	"Take a Bow" (pop song) & "If My Friends Could See Me Now" from Sweet Charity, with coaching from Tamzin Outhwaite (Musical Song)	Wildcard
Claire Hiller	"Take a Bow" (pop song) & "If My Friends Could See Me Now" from Sweet Charity, with coaching from Tamzin Outhwaite (Musical Song)	Eliminated

After the panel chose Amy, Bronte, Dani, Danielle, Jenny, Jessica, Lauren, Sophie, Steph and Stephanie to be in their top 10, Camille, Claire Ha., Claire Hi., Emilie, Emma, Katie, Philippa, Sarah, Tasheka and Tegan performed "Over the Rainbow" to be chosen as the wildcard and eleventh contestant in the live finals.

The studio guest was Jodie Prenger, who played Nancy in Oliver! after winning I'd Do Anything in 2008, and she performed "As Long as He Needs Me" from Oliver!.

=== Week 1 (3/4 April) ===
The first of the live finals on Saturday, 3 April saw the 11 finalists perform to stay in the competition. Emilie was announced as the wildcard contestant following the vote at the end of the previous programme. The girls' mission this week was to work on a farm, and they were judged by Countryfile's Adam Henson. He selected Bronte to win the mission; her prize was an extra performance during the results programme and she chose Amy, Emilie and Jessica to join her.

- Top 20 contestants: "The Merry Old Land of Oz" (from The Wizard of Oz)
- Group mash-up: "Anything You Can Do / Broken Heels" (Annie Get Your Gun / Alexandra Burke)
- Bronte (mission winner) with Amy, Emilie, Jessica and the remaining contestants: "Love Machine" (Girls Aloud)

Contestants' performances
Contestant	Performance Pair	Order	Song (Original artist)	Result
Stephanie Davis	Pair 1	1	"Mama Do (Uh Oh, Uh Oh)" (Pixie Lott)	Safe
Lauren Samuels	Pair 1	2	"Run"(Snow Patrol)	Safe
Dani Rayner	Pair 2	3	"Ego" (The Saturdays)	Safe
Steph Fearon	Pair 2	4	"I Just Can't Stop Loving You" (Michael Jackson)	Bottom two
Amy Diamond	Pair 3	5	"Big Girls Don't Cry" (Fergie)	Bottom two
Danielle Hope	Pair 3	6	"Red" (Daniel Merriweather)	Safe
Emilie Fleming	Solo Performance	7	"Breakaway" (Kelly Clarkson)	Safe
Bronte Barbe	Pair 4	8	"I Can't Make You Love Me" (Bonnie Raitt)	Safe
Jessica Robinson	Pair 4	9	"Rehab" (Amy Winehouse)	Safe
Sophie Evans	Pair 5	10	"If I Were a Boy"(Beyoncé)	Safe
Jenny Douglas	Pair 5	11	"So What" (Pink)	Safe

- Panel's verdict on who was not Dorothy:
  - Hancock: Amy Diamond
  - Partridge: Sophie Evans
  - Church: Dani Rayner

Sing-off:

Act	Sing Off Song	Results
Steph Fearon	"Whistle Down The Wind"	Saved by Lloyd Webber
Amy Diamond	"Whistle Down The Wind"	Eliminated

=== Week 2 (10/11 April) ===
The second live show on Saturday, 10 April saw the remaining 10 finalists perform to stay in the competition. The contestants worked with Hancock during the week, and their mission was to perform, in front of Hancock, the scene in The Wizard of Oz where Dorothy meets the Scarecrow. Also, the search for a dog to play Toto saw the top 50 selected from the open auditions.

- Group performances:
  - "It Really Was No Miracle / Ding-Dong! The Witch Is Dead" (from The Wizard of Oz)
  - "You Can't Stop the Beat" (from Hairspray)
  - Group mash-up: "Money / Material Girl" (Cabaret / Madonna)
  - "Get Happy" (Judy Garland)
- Theme: Different sides of Dorothy

Contestants' performances
Contestant	Performance Pair	Order	Song	Result
Sophie Evans	Pair 1	1	"That Don't Impress Me Much"(Shania Twain)	Safe
Jessica Robinson	Pair 1	2	"The Voice Within" (Christina Aguilera)	Safe
Bronte Barbe	Pair 2	3	"Suddenly I See"(KT Tunstall)	Bottom two
Dani Rayner	Pair 2	4	"Home"(Michael Bublé)	Safe
Steph Fearon	Pair 3	5	"It's Oh So Quiet"(Björk)	Safe
Jenny Douglas	Pair 3	6	"Songbird"(Fleetwood Mac)	Safe
Danielle Hope	Pair 4	7	"Just a Little Girl" (Amy Studt)	Safe
Lauren Samuels	Pair 4	8	"I'll Never Fall in Love Again" (from Promises, Promises)	Bottom two
Emilie Fleming	Pair 5	9	"The Boy Does Nothing"(Alesha Dixon)	Safe
Stephanie Davis	Pair 5	10	"Smile" (Charlie Chaplin)	Safe

- Panel's verdict on who was not Dorothy:
  - Hancock: Sophie Evans
  - Partridge: Jessica Robinson
  - Church: Emilie Fleming

Sing-off:

Act	Sing Off Song	Results
Bronte Barbe	"What I Did for Love" from A Chorus Line	Eliminated
Lauren Samuels	"What I Did for Love" from A Chorus Line	Saved by Lloyd Webber

=== Week 3 (17/18 April) ===
The third week of competition was dance week and the live show on Saturday 17 April 2010 saw the remaining nine finalists perform to stay in the competition. The contestants worked with John Partridge during the week, learning how to walk and perform in heels before performing with him in front of Lloyd Webber and choreographer Arlene Phillips. The search continued for a dog to play Toto narrowing it down to the Top 10.

- Group performances:
  - "Ease On down the Road" (from The Wiz)
  - "America" (from West Side Story)
  - "Buenos Aires" (from Evita)
  - Group mash-up: "Losing My Mind / Crazy in Love / Crazy" (Follies / Beyoncé Knowles / Gnarls Barkley)

Contestants' performances
Contestant	Performance Pair	Order	Song	Result
Dani Rayner	Pair 1	1	"One Night Only" (from Dreamgirls)	Bottom two
Sophie Evans	Pair 1	2	"I'm with You" (Avril Lavigne)	Safe
Lauren Samuels	Solo Performance	3	"Sway" (Dean Martin)	Safe
Emilie Fleming	Pair 2	4	"Moon River" (from Breakfast at Tiffany's)	Safe
Stephanie Davis	Pair 2	5	"Let's Get Loud" (Jennifer Lopez)	Safe
Steph Fearon	Pair 3	6	"Out Here on My Own" (Irene Cara)	Safe
Jenny Douglas	Pair 3	7	"Why Do Fools Fall in Love" (Frankie Lymon & The Teenagers)	Safe
Jessica Robinson	Pair 4	8	"Crazy Little Thing Called Love" (Queen)	Safe
Danielle Hope	Pair 4	9	"Could It Be Magic" (Barry Manilow)	Bottom two

- Panel's verdict on who was not Dorothy:
  - Sheila Hancock: Jessica Robinson
  - John Partridge: Emilie Fleming
  - Charlotte Church: Jenny Douglas

Sing-off:

Act	Sing Off Song	Results
Dani Rayner	"Maybe This Time" from Cabaret	Eliminated
Danielle Hope	"Maybe This Time" from Cabaret	Saved by Lloyd Webber

=== Week 4 (24/25 April) ===
The fourth live show on Saturday 24 April 2010 saw the remaining eight finalists perform to stay in the competition. Following a one-on-one session with Charlotte Church, the mission this week was learning to perform "No More Tears (Enough Is Enough)". In the search for a dog to play Toto, the final 10 auditioned in front of the Toto panel and Lloyd Webber and the final 5 were chosen.

- Group performances:
  - "If I Only Had the Heart" (a version of "If I Only Had a Brain" from The Wizard of Oz)
  - Emilie, Jenny, Lauren and Stephanie (The Deadwood Dames): "The Deadwood Stage (Whip-Crack-Away!)" (from Calamity Jane)
  - Danielle, Jessica, Sophie and Steph (The Oklahoma Outlaws): "Oklahoma" (from Oklahoma)
  - Group mash-up: "A Fine Romance / Bad Romance / Just Dance / Paparazzi" (Swing Time / Lady Gaga)
  - Charlotte Church and the eight contestants: "No More Tears (Enough Is Enough)" (Donna Summer & Barbra Streisand)

Contestants' performances
Contestant	Performance Pair	Order	Song	Result
Jenny Douglas	Pair 1	1	"Warwick Avenue" (Duffy)	Safe
Emilie Fleming	Pair 1	2	"Girls Just Want to Have Fun" (Cyndi Lauper)	Bottom two
Stephanie Davis	Pair 2	3	"Nobody Does It Better" (Carly Simon)	Safe
Lauren Samuels	Pair 2	4	"Nobody Knows" (Pink)	Safe
Sophie Evans	Pair 3	5	"Love Song" (Sara Bareilles)	Bottom two
Jessica Robinson	Pair 3	6	"There You'll Be" (Faith Hill)	Safe
Danielle Hope	Pair 4	7	"Cry Me a River" (Julie London)	Safe
Steph Fearon	Pair 4	8	"Use Somebody" (Kings of Leon)	Safe

- Panel's verdict on who was not Dorothy:
  - Sheila Hancock: Emilie Fleming
  - John Partridge: Emilie Fleming
  - Charlotte Church: Emilie Fleming

Sing-off:

Act	Sing Off Song	Results
Emilie Fleming	"I Know Him So Well" from Chess	Eliminated
Sophie Evans	"I Know Him So Well" from Chess	Saved by Lloyd Webber

=== Week 5 (1/2 May) ===
The fifth week of competition was big band week and the live show on Saturday 1 May 2010 saw the remaining seven finalists perform to stay in the competition. Lloyd Webber worked with the contestants this week, and their mission (excluding Jessica who was ill) was to walk through a dark forest alone where they face a choice of going home or going to Oz. This week also saw the first task for the dogs vying to play Toto. After a master class, they performed a scene from Legally Blonde at the Savoy Theatre and the judges chose Missy as the task winner.

- Group performances:
  - "Don't Rain on My Parade" (from Funny Girl)
  - "The Trolley Song" (from Meet Me in St. Louis)
  - Group mash-up: "Well, Did You Evah! / Get the Party Started / Wild Thing" (DuBarry Was a Lady / Pink / The Troggs)
  - "The Happening" (The Supremes)

Contestants' performances
Contestant	Performance Pair	Order	Song	Result
Steph Fearon	Pair 1	1	"Diamonds Are a Girl's Best Friend" ( from Gentlemen Prefer Blondes)	Bottom two
Jenny Douglas	Pair 1	2	"Feeling Good" (Nina Simone)	Safe
Sophie Evans	Solo Performance	3	"What a Wonderful World" (Louis Armstrong)	Safe
Danielle Hope	Pair 2	4	"Mambo Italiano" (Rosemary Clooney)	Safe
Lauren Samuels	Pair 2	5	"The Man that Got Away" (from A Star Is Born.)	Safe
Stephanie Davis	Pair 3	6	"Mr. Bojangles" (Sammy Davis Jr.)	Bottom two
Jessica Robinson	Pair 3	7	"Cabaret" (from Cabaret)	Safe

- Panel's verdict on who was not Dorothy:
  - Sheila Hancock: Stephanie Davis
  - John Partridge: Stephanie Davis
  - Charlotte Church: Sophie Evans

Sing-off:

Act	Sing Off Song	Results
Steph Fearon	"Tell Me on a Sunday"	Saved by Lloyd Webber
Stephanie Davis	"Tell Me on a Sunday"	Eliminated

=== Week 6 (8/9 May) ===
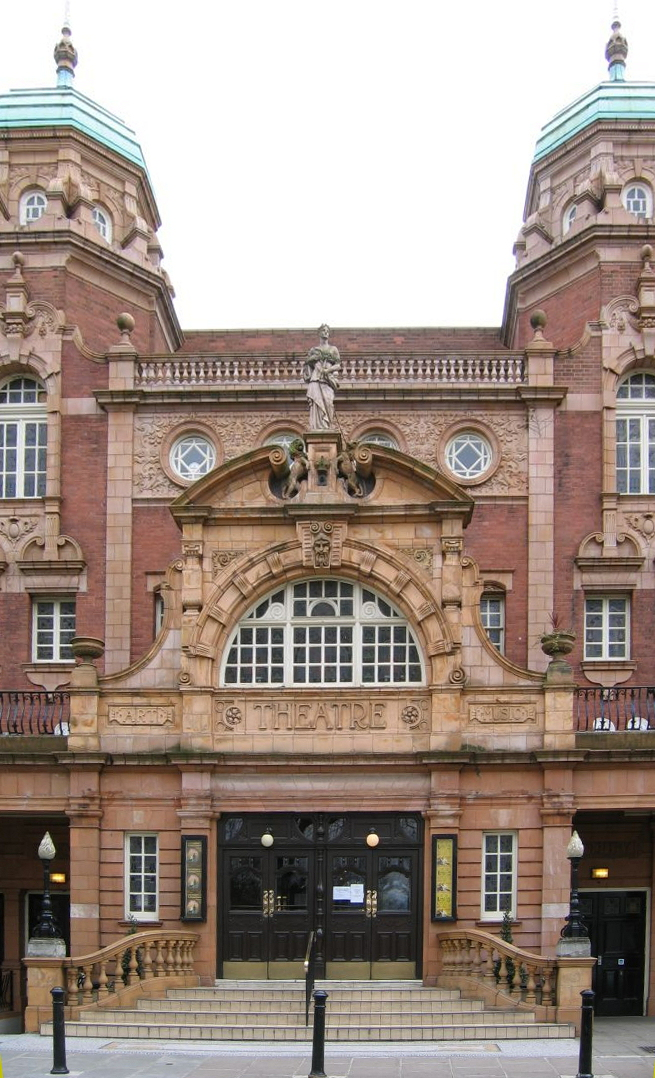
The Richmond Theatre hosted the task for the contestants this week.

The sixth week and quarter-final stage of the competition, with the live show on Saturday 8 May 2010, saw the remaining six contestants perform musical theatre songs for four places in the semi-final. This week, the task for the Toto contestants was to see how they would get on with the potential Dorothys at the Richmond Theatre. The dogs chose the Dorothy they wished to perform with, and with six Dorothys and only five dogs, Lauren was not chosen. The pairs performed in front of the Toto panel and an audience of children; the panel chose Spider as their 'top dog' and the audience chose Dave. Also this week, the contestants went to the opening night of Sweet Charity and met Tamzin Outhwaite backstage; during the results show Outhwaite performed "If My Friends Could See Me Now" from the musical.

- Group performances:
  - "Defying Gravity" (from Wicked)
  - "Talk to the Animals" (from Doctor Dolittle)
  - "The Actors" (by Charlotte Church)
  - Group mash-up: "Match Maker / Rich Girl / I Gotta Feeling" (Fiddler on the Roof / Gwen Stefani / The Black Eyed Peas)

Contestants' performances
Contestant	Performance Pair	Order	Song	Musical	Result
Danielle Hope	Pair 1	1	"On My Own"	Les Misérables	Safe
Jessica Robinson	Pair 1	2	"Supercalifragilisticexpialidocious"	Mary Poppins	Safe
Steph Fearon	Pair 2	3	"Somewhere"	West Side Story	Safe
Jenny Douglas	Pair 2	4	"Send in the Clowns"	A Little Night Music	Bottom two
Sophie Evans	Pair 3	5	"I Enjoy Being a Girl"	Flower Drum Song	Safe
Lauren Samuels	Pair 3	6	"Being Alive"	Company	Bottom two

- Panel's verdict on who was not Dorothy:
  - Sheila Hancock: Sophie Evans
  - John Partridge: Sophie Evans
  - Charlotte Church: Jenny Douglas

First sing-off:

Act	Sing Off Song	Results
Jenny Douglas	"Bridge over Troubled Water"	Eliminated
Lauren Samuels	"Bridge over Troubled Water"	Saved by Lloyd Webber

- After Jenny left the competition, the remaining contestants performed a medley of songs from The Wizard of Oz for viewer votes:
- Group performances:
  - "Follow the Yellow Brick Road" & "If I Only Had the Part"

Contestants' performances
Contestant	Order	Song	Result
Danielle Hope	1	"We're Off to See the Wizard"	Bottom two
Jessica Robinson	2	"It Really Was No Miracle"	Bottom two
Steph Fearon	3	"Ding-Dong! The Witch Is Dead"	Safe
Sophie Evans	4	"The Merry Old Land of Oz"	Safe
Lauren Samuels	5	"If I Only Had the Part"	Safe

Second sing-off:

Act	Sing Off Song	Results
Danielle Hope	"Take That Look Off Your Face" from Tell Me on a Sunday	Saved by Lloyd Webber
Jessica Robinson	"Take That Look Off Your Face" from Tell Me on a Sunday	Eliminated

=== Week 7 (15/16 May) ===
The seventh week of competition was the semi-final stage of the series. On 15 May 2010 the four remaining contestants sang live for a place in the final. The final task for the Toto contestants was to pull back a curtain to reveal the Wizard (Lloyd Webber); he chose Troy as his task winner, and the panel chose Eddie. Sierra Boggess visited the contestants during rehearsals, and she performed "Love Never Dies" from Love Never Dies during the results show.

- Group performances:
  - "Together (Wherever We Go)" (from Gypsy: A Musical Fable)
  - "I Cain't Say No" (from Oklahoma!)
  - Group mash-up: "Singin' in the Rain / Umbrella" (Singin' in the Rain / Rihanna)

Contestants' performances
Contestant	Performance Pair	Order	Song	Result
Sophie Evans	Pair 1	1	"Reflection" (Lea Salonga)	Safe
Steph Fearon	Pair 1	2	"Rule the World" (Take That)	Bottom two
Lauren Samuels	Pair 2	3	"Heaven" (Bryan Adams)	Bottom two
Danielle Hope	Pair 2	4	"When You Believe" (from The Prince of Egypt)	Safe

- Duets: After each girl had performed solo they each paired up to sing a duet
  - Sophie & Steph - "I'm Gonna Wash That Man Right Outta My Hair"
  - Danielle & Lauren - "Popular"
- Panel's verdict on who was not Dorothy:
  - Sheila Hancock: Steph Fearon
  - John Partridge: Steph Fearon
  - Charlotte Church: Steph Fearon

Sing-off:

Act	Sing Off Song	Results
Steph Fearon	"Another Suitcase in Another Hall" from Evita	Eliminated
Lauren Samuels	"Another Suitcase in Another Hall" from Evita	Saved by Lloyd Webber

=== Week 8 (22 May) ===
In the run-up to the final, the three remaining contestants visited Lloyd Webber's estate. There, their mission was to perform a scene and sing "Over the Rainbow". Also during the week, the eight eliminated contestants went to see Hancock in Sister Act and met her and some of the cast (including Amy Booth-Steel, an I'd Do Anything finalist) backstage.

- Group performances:
  - Finalists and former contestants: "Wizard of Oz Medley"
  - "If I Only Had a Brain" (from The Wizard of Oz)
  - Former eight contestants: "Empire State of Mind (Part II) Broken Down"with Olly Murs And Boy George (Alicia Keys)

Contestants' performances
Contestant	Order	Song	Order	Song of the Series	Result
Sophie Evans	1	"Tomorrow" (from Annie)	4	"Reflection"	Runner-up
Lauren Samuels	2	"I Could Have Danced All Night" (from My Fair Lady)	N/A	N/A (already eliminated)	Eliminated
Danielle Hope	3	"Seventy Six Trombones" (from The Music Man)	5	"Mambo Italiano"	Winner

- Winning Toto:
  - Dangerous Dave was revealed as the winning Toto.
- The Final Vote
  - The final vote was then announced and it was revealed that the winner was Danielle with Lloyd Webber saying, "Well I'm really pleased with the result; the nation's never got it wrong yet. You're a most fantastically talented kid with a huge future ahead and now the hard work starts, but my goodness me, you can act from the soul and that's something that's very, very special." Danielle then collected her ruby slippers from Lloyd Webber and concluded the series with a performance of "Over the Rainbow".

== Reception ==
The two audition episodes attracted 4.28 million (18.4% audience share) and 5.22 million viewers (23.9% share) according to unofficial overnight figures. The first live show attracted 5.417 million viewers (25.4% share).

All ratings are taken from the UK Programme Ratings website, BARB.

Show	Date	Official rating (millions)	Share
Auditions: Top 20 Selection	26 March 2010	4.55	18.4%
Auditions: Top 10 Selection	27 March 2010	5.62 (Note: 5.53 million on BBC1, 85,000 on BBC HD)	23.9%
Live Show 1	3 April 2010	5.70 (Note: 5.61 million on BBC1, 88,000 on BBC HD)	25.4%
Results 1	4 April 2010	4.30	—N/a
Live Show 2	10 April 2010	5.77 (Note: 5.61 million on BBC1, 156,000 on BBC HD)	26.1%
Results 2	11 April 2010	4.79	17.2%
Live Show 3	17 April 2010	4.96 (Note: 4.82 million on BBC1, 144,000 on BBC HD)	21.6%
Results 3	18 April 2010	4.94 (Note: 4.84 million on BBC1, 96,000 on BBC HD)	24.6%
Live Show 4	24 April 2010	5.56 (Note: 5.41 million on BBC1, 146,000 on BBC HD)	25.4%
Results 4	25 April 2010	6.14 (Note: 5.99 million on BBC1, 145,000 on BBC HD)	25.4%
Live Show 5	1 May 2010	5.66 (Note: 5.44 million on BBC1, 223,000 on BBC HD)	24.6%
Results 5	2 May 2010	5.77 (Note: 5.61 million on BBC1, 155,000 on BBC HD)	24.9%
Live Show 6	8 May 2010	5.94 (Note: 5.78 million on BBC1, 155,000 on BBC HD)	25.9%
Results 6	9 May 2010	5.86 (Note: 5.75 million on BBC1, 112,000 on BBC HD)	25.5%
Live Show 7	15 May 2010	5.74 (Note: 5.56 million on BBC1, 177,000 on BBC HD)	26.2%
Results 7	16 May 2010	5.76 (Note: 5.61 million on BBC1, 149,000 on BBC HD)	21.6%
The Final	22 May 2010	6.16 (Note: 5.97 million on BBC1, 190,000 on BBC HD)	34.2%
Final Results	22 May 2010	7.17 (Note: 6.95 million on BBC1, 170,000 on BBC HD)	30.2%
Average		5.58	24.2%

== Doctor Who controversy ==
The series attracted a different kind of media interest when an animated banner advertisement, also known as a "trail", depicting an animated Graham Norton dancing alongside the title of the series, aired during the climactic cliffhanger of the 24 April 2010 broadcast of the Doctor Who episode, "The Time of Angels". The BBC apologised after receiving over 5,000 complaints. Norton himself went on to parody the incident in his own show by placing a similar banner at the bottom of the screen and having a Dalek exterminate his own cartoon caricature.
