= Stephanie Fearon =

British stage and television actress

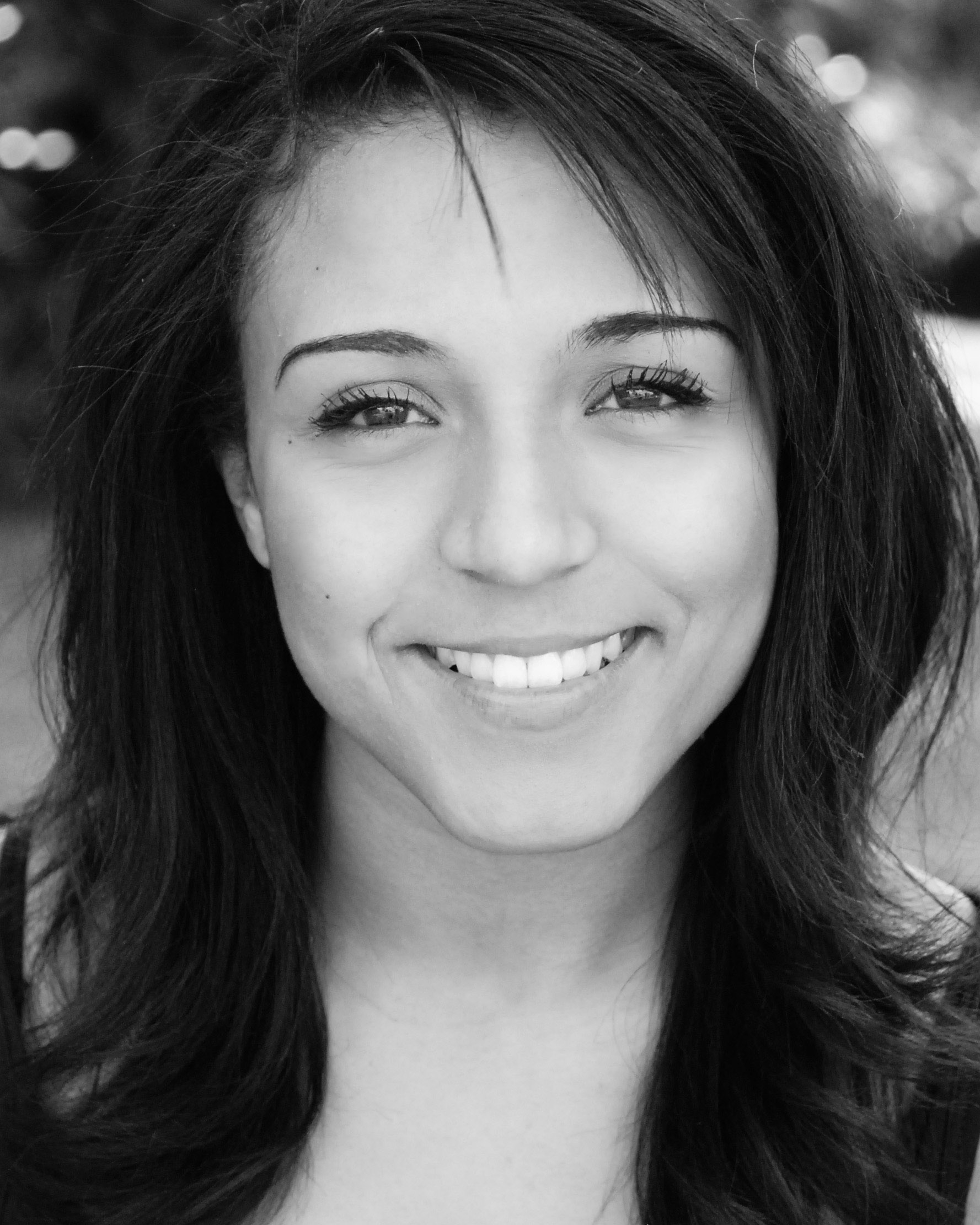
- Stephanie Fearon
- Born: Stephanie Leanne Fearon; 8 February 1989 (age 37); London, England
- Education: Italia Conti Academy of Theatre Arts
- Years active: 1993–present
- Website: StephanieFearon.com

Stephanie Leanne Fearon (sometimes credited as Steph Fearon; born 8 February 1989) is a British stage and television actress most noted for her TV appearances in the CITV show My Parents Are Aliens and the BBC talent-search Over the Rainbow.

== Background ==
Fearon, who grew up in Kingsbury, north west London, was born into a musical family. Her mother, Dorothy ("Dee") Fearon, is the singer with Baby D, who had a Number 1 hit in 1994 with "Let Me Be Your Fantasy". Her father, Phil Fearon, was in 1980s band Galaxy. Fearon attended the Sharon Harris Drama school in Wembley and St Gregory's Catholic Science College in Harrow before training at the Italia Conti Academy of Theatre Arts from the age of 17. Fearon graduated with a diploma in professional musical theatre in 2009. Fearon has two sisters and a brother. She is half Jamaican and half Maltese.

Fearon lived in London, where she shared a flat with fellow Over the Rainbow top-20 finalists Sophie Evans and Tegan Edwards.

== Career ==
Fearon appeared in a sing-a-long video for children at the age of four, A Day Full Of Songs, which was produced by Abbey Home Media in 1993. Her biggest TV break, however, was replacing Danielle McCormack in Series 7 of My Parents Are Aliens in 2005, after McCormack left to concentrate on her music career. Fearon played newcomer Harriet ("Harry"), appearing in 20 episodes and the series finale.

Fearon's other acting credits include college productions of Rent and A Midsummer Night's Dream, and professional productions of Whistle Down the Wind, The Wind in the Willows and Little Shop of Horrors. She also appeared in Channel 4's teen drama As If in 2001, BBC1's Casualty in 2004 and 2006, has worked on several BBC Radio 4 dramas and appeared as a pit dancer at the 2007 BRIT Awards on ITV.

=== Over the Rainbow ===
Fearon was part of the 2010 BBC TV talent hunt Over the Rainbow, in which Andrew Lloyd Webber searched for an actress to play Dorothy in a West End musical adaptation of The Wonderful Wizard of Oz. The competition was a reality TV show with a similar format to its predecessors I'd Do Anything, Any Dream Will Do and How Do You Solve a Problem Like Maria?. Fearon was credited as 'Steph' on the show, as there was another contestant with the same first name (Stephanie Davis), and finished fourth overall.

Viewers' votes placed Fearon in the bottom two contestants three times; in week one, week five and the semi-final. She was twice saved by Lloyd Webber but, in the semi-final sing-off on 16 May 2010, lost out to Lauren Samuels after the pair performed "Another Suitcase in Another Hall" from Evita. Lloyd Webber said: "I feel dreadful that I have to take a decision on who is best for Dorothy. I'm going to save Lauren." On being placed fourth in the contest, Fearon told the audience: "I had the best time of my life. I've made friends for life. I've learnt so much. Thanks to everyone backstage – you're all complete stars."

==== Solo performances ====
	Solo Song
Week one (03/04/10)	"I Just Can't Stop Loving You" (Michael Jackson)
Week two (10/04/10)	"It's Oh So Quiet" (Björk)
Week three (17/04/10)	"Out Here On My Own" (from Fame)
Week four (24/04/10)	"Use Somebody" (Kings of Leon)
Week five (01/05/10)	"Diamonds Are A Girl's Best Friend" (from Gentlemen Prefer Blondes)
Week six (08/05/10)	"Somewhere" (from West Side Story)
Week seven (semi-final) (15/05/10)	"Rule the World" (Take That)

=== After Over the Rainbow ===
Fearon landed a role in a revival of the Tony Award-winning production of Smokey Joe's Cafe less than a month after being voted off Over the Rainbow. The musical revue, which showcases 39 pop standards, was performed at the Landor Theatre, a pub theatre in Clapham, from 13 July until 4 September 2010. Mykal Rand directed the production, which also starred Kym Mazelle. She also appeared in a production of the musical The Wiz at the Milton Keynes Theatre, which ran for a week in September 2010, and performed in a Christmas pantomime production of Aladdin at the Buxton Opera House, playing Princess Jasmine, in December 2010.

Fearon appears with the other Over the Rainbow contestants in a Wizard of Oz medley featured as a b-side on the CD single of Danielle Hope's "Over the Rainbow." Fearon released her own album of showtunes and covers called My Parade in 2010.

Fearon appeared in April 2011 as Dorothy, alongside Sarah-Jane Honeywell as Glinda and Ben Hanson as the Scarecrow, in a touring production of The Wizard of Oz. The production, directed by Rob Forknall, was not related to the Lloyd Webber London production. She also played Diana Morales in a Tel-Aviv production of the musical A Chorus Line in October 2011, and during the 2011 Christmas pantomime season appeared as Cinderella at the Sands Centre, Carlisle. In February 2012 Fearon worked with Judy Craymer and Jennifer Saunders on a workshop for Viva Forever, the new Spice Girls musical, and in the summer of 2012 she took part in the musical Run at the Polka Theatre in Wimbledon, London.

Fearon appeared as Mimi Márquez in RENT the musical in 2012 in the Greenwich Greenwich Theatre, London. She also played the role of Diamond in the workshop of production of Viva Forever. Fearon is currently playing Lisa in the West End production of Mamma Mia! at the Novello Theatre.
