= Amy Diamond (model) =

English actress, singer & model

- Born: 8 February 1988 (age 38); Widnes, Cheshire, England
- Occupations: Model; actress; singer
- Website: amydiamond.net

Amy Diamond (born 8 February 1988) is an English actress, singer, former glamour model, and Page 3 girl.

== Early life ==
Diamond was born in Widnes, Cheshire. She currently lives in London. Diamond studied at St Peter and St Paul's Catholic High School and then went on to study performing arts at The Hammond School, Chester.

== Career ==
As a glamour model, Diamond has posed for British lads' mags such as Nuts and Loaded as well as tabloid newspaper The Sun. Diamond has also modelled as part of promotional work for brands such as Ann Summers. In 2009, she posed outside the British Houses of Parliament painted with the colours of the European flag as part of a publicity stunt for Libertas.

In 2010, Diamond took part in the BBC talent-search Over the Rainbow, which aimed to find an actress to play Dorothy in an upcoming production of The Wizard of Oz. Diamond made it through to become one of the top eleven finalists in the competition. In the first week of live performances for the public vote, she sang a rendition of Fergie's "Big Girls Don't Cry" but was eliminated after the vote and Andrew Lloyd Webber's decision. Diamond also took part in a group performance of Love Machine by Girls Aloud with contestants Bronte Barbe, Emilie Fleming, and Jessica Robinson and in the final show, performed with the former eight Dorothys in a group performance of Empire State of Mind (Part II) Broken Down by Alicia Keys.

Later, in 2010, Diamond was cast as "Janet" in a production of the musical The Drowsy Chaperone at Upstairs at The Gatehouse.

She has danced on cruise ships, and she also had a small part in the BBC One series Hustle.

Diamond currently works as a professional singer.

== See also ==
- Lad culture
