= Superstar (British TV series) =

British reality talent search series

- Genre: Reality
- Created by: Andrew Lloyd Webber
- Presented by: Amanda Holden
- Judges: Andrew Lloyd Webber; Melanie C Jason Donovan; Dawn French; David Grindrod
- Composer: Andrew Lloyd Webber
- Country of origin: United Kingdom
- Original language: English
- No. of series: 1
- No. of episodes: 12

Production
- Executive producer: Peter Davey
- Production locations: Various cities (auditions); Osea Island (Superstar Island); The Fountain Studios (live shows)
- Running time: 60–90 minutes (inc. adverts)
- Production company: ITV Studios

Original release
- Network: ITV
- Release: 7 July – 25 July 2012

Related
- How Do You Solve a Problem like Maria? (2006); Any Dream Will Do (2007); I'd Do Anything (2008); Over the Rainbow (2010)

Superstar is a British talent search series, looking for the lead role in a production of the 1971 rock opera Jesus Christ Superstar. The series started on 7 July 2012 on ITV and was presented by Amanda Holden.

In the final, on 25 July 2012, 31-year-old Ben Forster was chosen as Jesus to perform the role in the UK arena tour starting in September 2012. 24-year-old Rory Taylor came in second place.

== The Team ==
The series was presented by Amanda Holden. The Panel consisted of Andrew Lloyd Webber, Jason Donovan, Dawn French and Melanie C. David Grindrod and Will Burton led the casting team, with Yvie Burnett serving as the vocal coach.

== Format ==
=== Nationwide auditions ===
Cities where auditions were held.

The Nationwide auditions began in March 2012 visiting London, Dublin, Belfast, Manchester, Glasgow and Cardiff. The judges are Andrew Lloyd Webber, Melanie C, Jason Donovan and David Grindrod. Host Amanda Holden was on hand for the auditionees.

Grindrod judged the nationwide auditions and was joined by Donovan and Melanie C at the 'Callback' round held at the O2 Academy in Brixton, London. Over 100 contestants were invited to the 'Callback' round in London. Lloyd Webber watched all the performances from a balcony at the side of the stage.

=== Superstar Island ===
The final 41 contestants are invited to 'Superstar Island' (Osea Island in Essex) for a week of training. Jonathan Ansell is a notable contestant who failed to pass this stage of the show.

=== Final rounds ===
The final 30 contestants were invited to Lloyd Webber's villa in Majorca. After 10 were eliminated on arrival, the remaining contestants performed again in front of Lloyd Webber.

The next day, the contestants travelled back to Great Britain via coach (with the journey taking 25 hours) and performed a final time in front of the panel, with an accompanying band onstage, for a place in the live shows.

=== Live shows ===
The Live show stages of the search were judged by Melanie C, Jason Donovan, Dawn French and Andrew Lloyd Webber. The live shows were broadcast live from Fountain Studios in Wembley and took place over nine nights (excluding Saturday 21 and Sunday 22 July). The final was held on 25 July 2012.

The contestants perform on the first live show with the results of the public vote announced during the following night's show. The two contestants with the lowest votes competed in the Sing-Off to stay in the competition. After the performance, Lloyd Webber then decided which potential Jesus to keep in the contest. The saved Jesuses could be seen on the "Stairway to Heaven". The eliminated Jesus(es) then "walks into the light" and leaves the stage.

== Finalists ==
Finalist	Age*	From	Status
Afnan Iftikhar	23	North Shields	Eliminated 1st on Night 1
Dirk Johnson	24	Scotland	Eliminated 2nd on Night 2
Tim Prottey-Jones	32	Birmingham	Eliminated 3rd on Night 4
Niall Sheehy	31	County Wicklow	Eliminated 4th on Night 5
Jon Moses	37	York	Eliminated 5th on Night 6
Jeff Anderson	21	Belfast	Eliminated 6th on Night 6
Nathan James	23	Reading	Eliminated 7th on Night 7
David Hunter	27	Warrington	Eliminated 8th on Night 8
Roger Wright	41	London	Eliminated 9th on Night 9
Rory Taylor	24	Wirral	Runner-up
Ben Forster	31	Sunderland	Winner

* at time of competition

=== Results summary ===
Colour key

–	Contestant was in the bottom two and who was saved after the sing off
–	Contestant was eliminated after the sing off
–	Contestant who received the most public votes

Weekly results per contestant
Contestant	Night 1	Night 2	Night 3		Night 5	Night 6	Night 7	Night 8	Final
Contestant	Night 1	Night 2	Night 3	Night 4	Night 5	Night 6	Night 7	Night 8	Final
Ben Forster	Safe	Safe	Safe	Safe	Safe	Safe	Safe	Safe	Winner (night 9)
Rory Taylor	Safe	Safe	Safe	Safe	Bottom two	Safe	Safe	Bottom two	Runner-up (night 9)
Roger Wright	Safe	Safe	Safe	Safe	Safe	Bottom three	Bottom two	Safe	Eliminated (night 9)
David Hunter	Safe	Safe	Bottom two	Bottom two	Safe	Safe	Safe	Eliminated	Eliminated (night 8)
Nathan James	Safe	Safe	Safe	Safe	Safe	Safe	Eliminated	Eliminated (night 7)	
Jeff Anderson	Safe	Safe	Safe	Safe	Safe	Eliminated	Eliminated (night 6)		
Jon Moses	Safe	Safe	Safe	Safe	Safe	Eliminated	Eliminated (night 6)		
Niall Sheehy	Safe	Safe	Safe	Safe	Eliminated	Eliminated (night 5)			
Tim Prottey-Jones	Safe	Bottom two	Bottom two	Eliminated	Eliminated (night 4)				
Dirk Johnson	Bottom two	Eliminated	Eliminated (night 2)						
Afnan Iftikhar	Eliminated	Eliminated (night 1)							

== Live show details ==
=== Night 1 (15 July 2012) ===
- Group performance: "Superstar" (Andrew Lloyd Webber)

Contestants' performances on the first live show
Contestant	Order	Song (artist)	Result (Night 2)
David Hunter	1	"Forget You" (Cee Lo Green)	Safe
Dirk Johnson	2	"Make You Feel My Love" (Bob Dylan)	Bottom two
Nathan James	3	"Sign Your Name" " (Terence Trent D'Arby)	Safe
Ben Forster	4	"Somebody That I Used to Know" (Gotye)	Safe
Niall Sheehy	5	"Stay" (Hurts)	Safe
Tim Prottey-Jones	6	"Stone Cold Sober" " (Paloma Faith)	Safe
Roger Wright	7	"A Whiter Shade of Pale" (Procol Harum)	Safe
Jon Moses	8	"Since U Been Gone" (Kelly Clarkson)	Safe
Afnan Iftikhar	9	"Next to Me" (Emeli Sande)	Bottom two
Jeff Anderson	10	"Red" (Daniel Merriweather)	Safe
Rory Taylor	11	"Are You Gonna Go My Way" (Lenny Kravitz)	Safe

- Sing-Off (Night 2)

Act	Sing Off Song	Results
Afnan Iftikhar	"Memory" from Cats	Eliminated
Dirk Johnson	"Memory" from Cats	Saved by Lloyd Webber

=== Night 2 (16 July 2012) ===
Contestants' performances on the second live show
Contestant	Order	Song (artist)	Result (Night 3)
Ben Forster	1	"She Said" (Plan B)	Safe
Tim Prottey-Jones	2	"The First Cut Is the Deepest" (Cat Stevens)	Bottom two
Rory Taylor	3	"Stronger (What Doesn't Kill You)" (Kelly Clarkson)	Safe
Nathan James	4	"Dedication to My Ex" (Lloyd ft. André 3000 & Lil Wayne)	Safe
Roger Wright	5	"Part of Me" (Katy Perry)	Safe
Dirk Johnson	6	"Titanium" (Sia)	Bottom two
Jeff Anderson	7	"Mr Brightside" (The Killers)	Safe
Niall Sheehy	8	"The Man Who Can't Be Moved" (The Script)	Safe
Jon Moses	9	"I Can't Make You Love Me" (Bonnie Raitt)	Safe
David Hunter	10	"Nothing's Real But Love" (Rebecca Ferguson)	Safe

- Sing-Off (Night 3)

Act	Sing Off Song	Results
Dirk Johnson	"Hurt"	Eliminated
Tim Prottey-Jones	"Hurt"	Saved by Lloyd Webber

=== Night 3 (17 July 2012) ===
- Group performance: "Sgt. Pepper's Lonely Hearts Club Band" (The Beatles)

Contestants' performances on the third live show
Contestant	Order	Song (artist)	Result (Night 4)
Roger Wright	1	"More Than Words"( Extreme)	Safe
Nathan James	2	"To Be With You"( Mr. Big)	Safe
Rory Taylor	3	"Dakota"(Stereophonics)	Safe
Jon Moses	4	"I Want To Know What Love Is"( Foreigner)	Safe
David Hunter	5	"You've Got The Love" ( The Source feat Candi Staton)	Bottom two
Ben Forster	6	"Everybody Hurts"(R.E.M.)	Safe
Tim Prottey-Jones	7	"Time Is Running Out"(Muse)	Bottom two
Jeff Anderson	8	"How You Remind Me"(Nickelback)	Safe
Niall Sheehy	9	"Dirty Diana" (Michael Jackson)	Safe

- Sing-Off (Night 4)

Act	Sing Off Song	Results
David Hunter	"The Long and Winding Road"	Saved by Lloyd Webber (Night 5) ^{1}
Tim Prottey-Jones	"The Long and Winding Road"	Eliminated (Night 5) ^{1}

^1 Before the performance, Lloyd Webber decided not to eliminate either of them until he had seen the solo performances they had prepared for the night. They both performed on Night 4 with the elimination at the end of the show.

=== Night 4 (18 July 2012) ===
- Group performance: "Viva la Vida" (Coldplay)
- Guest performance: "Ruby" (Kaiser Chiefs)

Contestants' performances on the fourth live show
Contestant	Order	Song (artist)	Result (Night 5)
Niall Sheehy	1	"One" (U2)	Safe
Rory Taylor	2	"Roxanne" (The Police)	Safe
David Hunter	3	"One Day Like This" (Elbow)	Bottom two (Night 4)
Ben Forster	4	"This Love" (Maroon 5)	Safe
Jon Moses	5	"I Won't Let You Go" (James Morrison)	Safe
Nathan James	6	"How to Save a Life" (The Fray)	Safe
Roger Wright	7	"Here I Go Again" (Whitesnake)	Safe
Tim Prottey-Jones	8	"Dream On" (Aerosmith)	Eliminated (Night 4)
Jeff Anderson	9	"Kiss from a Rose" (Seal)	Safe

=== Night 5 (19 July 2012) ===
- Group performance: "Livin' on a Prayer" (Bon Jovi)
- Guest performance: "Baby Come Home" (Scissor Sisters)

Contestants' performances on the fifth live show
Contestant	Order	Song (artist)	Result
Jeff Anderson	1	"(I Can't Get No) Satisfaction" (The Rolling Stones)	Safe
David Hunter	2	"Nothing Compares 2 U" (Sinéad O'Connor)	Safe
Rory Taylor	3	"Fix You" (Coldplay)	Bottom two
Nathan James	4	"Ain't No Sunshine" (Bill Withers)	Safe
Ben Forster	5	"Fast Car" (Tracy Chapman)	Safe
Niall Sheehy	6	"Wherever You Will Go" (The Calling)	Bottom two
Jon Moses	7	"Feel" (Robbie Williams)	Safe
Roger Wright	8	"Rolling in the Deep" (Adele)	Safe

- Sing-Off:

Act	Sing Off Song	Results
Rory Taylor	"Alone"	Saved by Lloyd Webber
Niall Sheehy	"Alone"	Eliminated

=== Night 6 (20 July 2012) ===
- Group performance: "Pinball Wizard" (The Who)
- Guest performance: "30 Minute Love Affair" (Paloma Faith)

Contestants' performances on the sixth live show
Contestant	Order	Song (artist)	Result
Jon Moses	1	"I Still Haven't Found What I'm Looking For" (U2)	Bottom three
Jeff Anderson	2	"Whole Lotta Love" (Led Zeppelin)	Bottom three
Roger Wright	3	"Feeling Good" (Nina Simone)	Bottom three
Ben Forster	4	"Cold As Ice"(Foreigner)	Safe
Rory Taylor	5	"Silenced by the Night" (Keane)	Safe
David Hunter	6	"Apologize"(OneRepublic)	Safe
Nathan James	7	"Sweet Child o' Mine"(Guns N' Roses)	Safe

- Sing-Off:

Act	Sing Off Song	Results
Jon Moses	"Could We Start Again Please?" from Jesus Christ Superstar	Eliminated
Jeff Anderson	"Could We Start Again Please?" from Jesus Christ Superstar	Eliminated
Roger Wright	"Could We Start Again Please?" from Jesus Christ Superstar	Saved by Lloyd Webber

=== Night 7 (23 July 2012) ===
- Group performance: "We Are Young" (fun.)
- Guest performance: "Greatest Day" (Gary Barlow, featuring Final 5)

Contestants' performances on the seventh live show
Contestant	Order	Song (artist)	Result
Nathan James	1	"Born This Way" (Lady Gaga)	Bottom two
Roger Wright	2	"Handbags and Gladrags" (Rod Stewart)	Bottom two
David Hunter	3	"Too Close" (Alex Clare)	Safe
Rory Taylor	4	"Under Pressure" (Queen feat David Bowie)	Safe
Ben Forster	5	"It Must Have Been Love" (Roxette)	Safe

- Sing-Off

Act	Sing Off Song	Results
Nathan James	"Love Changes Everything" from Aspects of Love	Eliminated
Roger Wright	"Love Changes Everything" from Aspects of Love	Saved by Lloyd Webber

=== Night 8: Semi-final (24 July 2012) ===
- Group performance: "What's the Buzz" (Andrew Lloyd Webber and Tim Rice)
- Guest performance: "Habanera" (Katherine Jenkins)

Contestants' performances on the eighth live show
Contestant	Order	Song (artist)	Result
Rory Taylor	1	"In the Air Tonight" (Phil Collins)	Bottom two
Ben Forster	2	"Run"(Snow Patrol)	Safe
Roger Wright	3	"Hard to Handle"(Otis Redding)	Safe
David Hunter	4	"I Try"(Macy Gray)	Bottom two

Sing-Off

Act	Sing Off Song	Results
David Hunter	"No Matter What" from Whistle Down the Wind	Eliminated
Rory Taylor	"No Matter What" from Whistle Down the Wind	Saved by Lloyd Webber

=== Night 9: Final (25 July 2012) ===
- Group performances: "Hosanna" and "Gethsemane" (Andrew Lloyd Webber and Tim Rice)
- Guest performance: "I Don't Know How to Love Him" (Melanie C, featuring Andrew Lloyd Webber)

Contestants' performances on the ninth live show
Contestant	Order	Song (artist)	Result
Ben Forster	1	"Who Wants to Live Forever" (Queen)	Winner
Rory Taylor	2	"I Don't Want to Miss a Thing" (Aerosmith)	Runner-up
Roger Wright	3	"Don't Let the Sun Go Down on Me" (George Michael feat Elton John)	Eliminated

== The Arena Tour ==
The tour travelled across the country from 21 September until 21 October 2012 and toured in the following venues: London O2 Arena, Glasgow SECC, Newcastle Metro Radio Arena, Manchester Arena, Motorpoint Arena Cardiff, National Indoor Arena Birmingham, Belfast Odyssey, The O2 Dublin, Echo Arena Liverpool, Nottingham Capital FM and Motorpoint Arena Sheffield. Joining Forster was comedian Tim Minchin as Judas Iscariot, Melanie C as Mary Magdalene, BBC Radio 1 DJ Chris Moyles as King Herod Antipas, Alexander Hanson as Pontius Pilate, Pete Gallagher as Caiaphas, Gerard Bentall as Annas, Michael Pickering as Peter, and Giovanni Spano as Simon Zealotes.

The tour resumed in March 2013 in Australia with Forster, Minchin, and Melanie C reprising their respective roles. Australian TV personality Andrew O'Keefe played the role of King Herod for the Australian leg of the tour, with New Zealand born Jon Stevens (who played Judas in the 1992 Australian arena tour and the 1994 theatre production) playing Pilate. Superstar runner-up Rory Taylor appeared as Simon Zealotes.

The North American tour was to commence on 9 June starting in New Orleans, with stops including Toronto, Chicago, Los Angeles, New York City, and more before ending in Philadelphia on 17 August. This leg of the tour was to feature Forster reprising his role as Jesus, Brandon Boyd of rock band Incubus as Judas, Destiny's Child singer Michelle Williams as Mary Magdalene, former 'N Sync singer JC Chasez as Pilate, and former Sex Pistols and Public Image Ltd lead singer John Lydon as King Herod. On 30 May 2014, the tour was cancelled, mostly due to poor ticket sales.

== Reception ==
Official ratings are supplied by the UK Programme Ratings website, BARB.

=== Ratings ===
Episode	Air date	Timeslot	Overnight ratings (millions)	Official ratings (millions)	Weekly rank
Auditions	7 July	19:25	3.04	3.03	#18
Superstar Island	8 July	20:00	3.11	3.16	#16
The Final 30	14 July	20:00	2.89	2.95	#29
Live show 1	15 July	20:00	3.08	2.99	#27
Live show 2	16 July	21:00	2.83	2.81	#26
Live show 3	17 July	21:00	2.37	Under 2.66	Outside Top 30
Live show 4	18 July	21:00	2.69	2.67	#29
Live show 5	19 July	21:00	2.90	2.83	#25
Live show 6	20 July	21:00	2.64	2.66	#30
Live show 7	23 July	21:00	2.59	2.49	#22
Semi-final	24 July	21:00	2.54	2.54	#21
Final	25 July	21:00	3.17	3.11	#13
Series average	2012	N/A	2.82	2.82	N/A
