= Danielle Hope =

English actress & singer (born 1992)

- Born: 26 April 1992 (age 34); Manchester, England, United Kingdom
- Occupations: Actress, singer
- Years active: 2010–present

Danielle Hope (born 26 April 1992) is an English actress and singer. She was the winner of the BBC talent contest Over The Rainbow and as a result played the part of Dorothy in the Andrew Lloyd Webber production of The Wizard of Oz, which began performances at the London Palladium in the West End in February 2011. Following this role, she went on to play the role of Éponine in Les Misérables in the West End, starting in June 2012.

== Background ==
Hope lived in Urmston, Greater Manchester, and attended Knutsford High School in Cheshire, concentrating in drama and dance. Hope appeared in many of her school's musical theatre productions, playing such roles as Carmen in the musical Fame, the narrator in Joseph and the Amazing Technicolor Dreamcoat and Maria in West Side Story. She also appeared in We Will Rock You alongside Olivier Award nominee, Charlotte Wakefield.

She left her part-time job as a waitress to focus on her A-level studies in Drama and Dance, and a BTEC National Award Musical Theatre. She has also studied dance privately and performed at dance festivals, including the BBC African Dance Project at Bridgewater Hall.

== Career ==
=== Over the Rainbow ===
While still at school, Hope was chosen from over 9,000 girls to be in the final ten and perform live, on the BBC reality TV show Over The Rainbow, for the chance to play Dorothy in the forthcoming West End musical adaptation of The Wizard of Oz. Hope's Dorothy colour was red, and she believed that she would portray a "fiery character, with a strong opinion and mind".

She was popular with the judges from the beginning of the live shows. After her performance of "Just a Little Girl" in week two, John Partridge said: "No one is going to look over you after that performance because it was your best to date. It was committed, it was intelligent and an extremely sophisticated performance for a girl your age". Andrew Lloyd Webber agreed and said "Danielle, you are really fantastic. You are a very, very strong contender". Nevertheless, Hope found herself in the bottom two with Dani Rayner the following week. After her performance of "Maybe This Time" from Cabaret, Lloyd Webber saved Hope.

In week six, having performed "On My Own" from Les Misérables, she received some criticism from the judges. Lloyd Webber suggested that she needed to learn how to disguise the break in her voice, and Charlotte Church agreed, saying that her top notes could get "a little bit shouty". Sheila Hancock agreed with Church, but was still full of praise, saying that she saw a similar "star quality" to that of Catherine Zeta-Jones. In this sing-off, Hope competed against Jessica Robinson, who was the only remaining contestant not to have been in the bottom two. After performing "Take That Look Off Your Face" from Tell Me on a Sunday, Lloyd Webber once again saved Hope, stating that "Both of you are really terrific girls, but I am just thinking of Dorothy here, so I am going to save Danielle".

Following the double eviction of Robinson and Jenny Douglas, the remaining contestants got the chance to go home for a day. Hope went back to her old school for the first time since the filming of the live shows began; there, her classmates greeted her with a hand-made yellow brick road, along with ruby slippers, and a Toto-style cuddly dog to make her feel at home.

In week seven, Hope and Lauren Samuels performed a duet of the song "Popular" from Wicked, which was described as one of the highlights of the series. After the performance, Charlotte Church told host Graham Norton that she thought Lloyd Webber should "write a musical for just those two". Towards the end of the show, Hope became the favourite to win with odds of 8/11, ahead of fellow contestants Sophie Evans at 15/8 and Lauren Samuels, whose odds slipped to 4/1 after appearing in the sing-off in the semi-finals shown on 16 May.

The next week at the final, which aired on 22 May, Hope won the contest and the role of Dorothy.

==== Solo performances ====
	Solo song
Week one (3 April 2010)	"Red" (Daniel Merriweather)
Week two (10 April 2010)	"Just a Little Girl" (Amy Studt)
Week three (17 April 2010)	"Could It Be Magic" (Barry Manilow)
Week four (24 April 2010)	"Cry Me a River" (Julie London)
Week five (1 May 2010)	"Mambo Italiano" (Rosemary Clooney)
Week six (8 May 2010)	"On My Own" (from Les Misérables)
Week seven (semi-final) (15 May 2010)	"When You Believe" (from The Prince of Egypt)
Week eight (final) (22 May 2010)	"76 Trombones" (from The Music Man)

=== After Over the Rainbow ===
As the winner of Over the Rainbow, and only 18 years old, Hope played the role of Dorothy in the new London production of The Wizard of Oz. Previews commenced 7 February 2011, with the opening night on 1 March. She starred alongside Michael Crawford in the title role, with Over the Rainbow runner-up Sophie Evans as the alternate Dorothy; performing the role on Tuesday evenings and during Hope's holidays and other unforeseen absences. She won the 2011 BroadwayWorld UK Award for Best Leading Actress In a Musical and was also nominated for the whatsonstage.com Theatergoers Choice Award for Best London Newcomer. Hope played her final performance in the production on 5 February 2012, the same day that her co-star, Michael Crawford, left. Evans succeeded her in the role. She then appeared as Éponine in the West End production of Les Misérables, having joined the cast on 18 June 2012. In December 2012, she was nominated for the Whatsonstage.com Award for Best Takeover in a Role for her performance. On 16 June 2013, Hope finished her run in the show and was replaced by Carrie Hope Fletcher.

It was announced on 7 January 2016 that Hope would return to the role of Éponine for a limited engagement from 15 February 2016 until 2 April 2016; taking over the role from Fletcher. On 2 April 2016, Hope finished her run in the show and was replaced by Eva Noblezada.

Hope played the role of Snow White in the Birmingham Hippodrome's 2013/2014 Christmas pantomime of Snow White and the Seven Dwarfs, her pantomime debut. She starred alongside Over the Rainbow judge John Partridge.

During May 2014, Hope played the role of Cathy in the two-hander musical The Last Five Years in a limited-season production which played in London and Brighton.

Hope then joined the UK Tour of Joseph and the Amazing Technicolor Dreamcoat, playing the Narrator. She stayed with the tour from 23 July 2014 until 29 November 2014.

Following this, Hope played the part of Maria from 15 January 2015 to 1 August 2015 on the 2015 UK Tour of The Sound of Music. During this time, Hope also staged her first concert, Bring the Future Faster at 54Below in New York. A live recording was released as a CD and digital download.

Beginning 10 March 2017, Hope took on the part of Sandy in the UK Tour of Grease the Musical. Hope played her last performance on 29 January 2018 at the Menora Mivtachim Arena in Tel Aviv, Israel.

After Grease, Hope played the role of Sherrie in the UK tour of the jukebox musical Rock of Ages. She played the role from September–November 2018 and was subsequently replaced by Jodie Steele.

Hope reprised the role of Snow White for the London Palladium's production of Snow White and the Seven Dwarfs during the 2018/19 pantomime season. It was announced in October 2019 that Hope would be returning to the West End, playing the role of Betty Haynes in a limited run of White Christmas at the Dominion Theatre.

Hope is currently starring in an off-Broadway production of Kinky Boots playing the role of Lauren, for a limited summer run.

== Theatre credits ==
Year	Production	Role	Venue
2011–2012	The Wizard of Oz	Dorothy Gale	London Palladium
2012–2013	Les Misérables	Eponine	Queen's Theatre
2013–2014	Snow White and the Seven Dwarfs	Snow White	Birmingham Hippodrome
2014	The Last Five Years	Cathy	UK Tour
2014	Joseph and the Amazing Technicolor Dreamcoat	Narrator	UK Tour
2015	The Sound of Music	Maria von Trapp	UK Tour
2015–16	Les Misérables	Eponine	Queen's Theatre
2017–2018	Grease	Sandy Dumbrowski	UK Tour
2018	Rock of Ages	Sherrie	UK Tour
2018	Aladdin	Aladdin	Concordia Theatre
2018–2019	Snow White and the Seven Dwarfs	Snow White	London Palladium
2019	White Christmas	Betty Haynes	Dominion Theatre
2022	Kinky Boots	Lauren	Stage 42 Theater
2023	Waterfall: A New Musical (2023 production)	Katherine Bingham	Muangthai Rachadalai Theatre

== Discography ==
Hope released a single of the song "Over the Rainbow" that was made available to download on 23 May 2010, with a physical single available to purchase from 31 May 2010. The CD single also features "The Wizard of Oz Medley" featuring Hope and fellow finalists Lauren Samuels and Sophie Evans, including the tracks "Follow the Yellow Brick Road", "We're Off to See the Wizard", "It Really Was No Miracle", "Ding Dong the Witch Is Dead", "The Merry Old Land of Oz" and "If I Only Had a Heart". The single is a charity record, raising money for both the BBC Performing Arts Fund and Prostate UK. Sales of the download single were good, with midweek charts for 26 May showing that the single had achieved a place in the UK top 20. However, when the week's charts were revealed on Sunday 30 May, the single had entered the charts at number 29.

Hope also features on the cast album for the 2011 The Wizard of Oz West End show, released 9 May 2011.
