= SSPP =

SSPP may refer to:

- Shan State Progress Party
- St Peter and St Paul's Catholic Voluntary Academy
