= My Paper Made Men =

2008 studio album by Amy Studt

Studio album by Amy Studt
- Released: May 5, 2008 (digital album); March 2, 2009 (CD album)
- Recorded: 2007–2008
- Genre: Alternative rock
- Label: 19

Amy Studt chronology
False Smiles (2003)	My Paper Made Men (2008)	Happiest Girl in the Universe (2019)

Singles from My Paper Made Men
- 1. "Furniture" Released: December 3, 2007; 2. "Chasing the Light" Released: April 28, 2008; 3. "Nice Boys" Released: March 1, 2009

Professional ratings
Review scores
Source	Rating
Mojo	4/5 stars
Digital Spy	3/5 stars

My Paper Made Men is the second album by Amy Studt released nearly five years after her debut False Smiles.

It is said to be different from her first album False Smiles, the Los Angeles Times said to "ignore any dim memories of her midteens pop phase a while ago".

Initially it was released as a download-only album in early 2008, a week after the single "Chasing the Light", which only managed a #277 peak. In early 2009 it was released physically with the lead single being "Nice Boys", which only managed a peak at #165, with the album failing to chart.

== Singles and other songs ==
The first single from the album "Furniture" was released on December 3, 2007, as a download-only single, however, it failed to chart. The second single "Chasing the Light" was released a week before the album, on April 28, and has so far charted at #277 on the UK Singles Chart. Several songs have been made available such as "Paper Made Men" (originally titled "My Paper Made Man") and "Sad, Sad World" (B-Side to "Furniture")

According to her official website, a further single, "Nice Boys" was released and has an accompanying video. Studt posted a sneak preview of the "Nice Boys" video on YouTube a week before the full video was posted.

== Track listing ==
1. "Sad, Sad World" (Amy Studt, Eg White) — 4:29
2. "She Ran" (Studt, Andrew Crutwell-Jones) — 3:15
3. "Furniture" (Studt, Crutwell-Jones) — 3:40
4. "She Walks Beautiful" (Studt, Louis Biancaniello, Sam Watters) — 5:38
5. "One Last Cigarette" (Studt, White) — 3:31
6. "Nice Boys" (Studt, Crutwell-Jones) — 3:32
7. "Walking Out" (Studt, John Fortis) — 4:00
8. "Chasing the Light" (Studt, Biancaniello, Watters) — 4:11
9. "Paper Made Man" (Studt, Guy Sigsworth) — 3:40
10. "Here Lies Love" (Studt, Crutwell-Jones) — 3:35
11. "Foolish Heart" (Studt, Peter-John Vettese & Felix Howard) — 3.33 (Bonus Track featured only on the 2009 iTunes re-release)
12. "The Lucky Ones" (Studt, Peter Woodruffe, Charlie Grant) — 3:35 (Bonus Track featured only on the 2009 CD release)
