= Collectors Club =

English indie rock band

- Origin: Middlesbrough, / Liverpool, England
- Genres: Indie rock, pop
- Years active: 2011–2015
- Members: Joe Smithson; Jesse Eigen; Dave Ormsby; Jack Kelsey
- Past members: Lewis Mondal; Chris Weatherill; Joe Cockerline; Chris Readman; Joshua Barrett
- Website: www.wearecollectorsclub.com

Collectors Club were an English indie rock band based in Liverpool. Formed in 2010, the band consisted of Joe Smithson (Guitar and vocals), Jesse Eigen (Bass and vocals), Jack Kelsey (Guitar and vocals) and Dave Ormsby (Drums).

== History ==
Formed in 2010 as a sixth-form band, Collectors Club was originally a six-piece band including Joe Smithson and Lewis Mondal, who were both at the time members of Middlesbrough-based band The Master Colony. Focused initially on recording music than on playing it live, the band played their first gig at Uncle Albert's in Middlesbrough in December 2010, by which point several tracks had already been made available to download free via music sharing site SoundCloud. This had gathered the group a following already and made the first gig a success, and following attention from Bob Fischer of BBC Radio Tees, the band were offered a headline gig at Middlesbrough club Empire, with support from Toyger.

In June 2011 the band were offered a slot at the BBC Introducing stage at T in the Park festival 2011, which they accepted. For several hours after official videos of the bands playing the festival had been posted online, Collectors Club were the fifth most-shared artist of the festival's entire line-up.

Collectors Club soon began to be noticed by more well-known bands and supported Pete and the Pirates, Mona and Mystery Jets. On 1 April 2012 their first single, First to Know, was released, and the official video, starring Jessica Robinson and filmed in and around Middlesbrough and Leeds, followed on 19 April. The single achieved some airplay, being featured on 6 Music's The Tom Robinson Show and later on BBC Radio 2's After Midnight presented by Janice Long.

During the summer of 2014, the band's popularity continued to grow and shows included support for The Human League and Martha and the Vandellas amongst others. On 13 April 2015 the band released "Shoulder to Shoulder" – the first single from their forthcoming EP produced by Grammy and Brit Award-winning producer Steve Levine. The band disbanded in late 2015.

== Reception ==
The band attracted much favourable attention early on, being compared to fellow indie bands Vampire Weekend and Bombay Bicycle Club. When First to Know was released in 2012 the comparisons continued, with music magazine Manifesto comparing them to Little Comets. The review also noted that 'any similarities are inconsequential, however, as this is a pop song so joyous and gratifying it could throw up on your dog and you'd still forgive it'. The magazine awarded the single a high rating of 4 out of 5. During an appearance on BBC Radio Tees, host Bob Fischer described their song 'Still Lie With You' as 'pure summer – the perfect indie pop song', and, similarly, music website Drowned in Sound called First to Know 'a gloriously carefree piece of indie-pop, which feels unequivocally summery'. Following the release of the band's second single "Wanna Be You", Collectors Club was selected to appear on the BBC Introducing Picks for 2013 compilation album download, made available on 2 January 2013. The band's latest single "Shoulder to Shoulder" was described by Chris Hawkins of Radio 6 as "absolutely perfect new pop music".

== Discography ==
Title	Date Released	Formats	Notes
NARC. Compilation CD No. 6	29 March 2012	CD	Free with NARC. magazine No. 72, includes the single First to Know
"First to Know"	1 April 2012	digital download	
"Wanna Be You"	23 October 2012	digital download	
"BBC Introducing Picks for 2013"	2 January 2013	digital download	A free digital download-only compilation comprising BBC Introducing radio host's picks of the year from across England. Includes the single "Wanna Be You".
"Shoulder to Shoulder"	13 April 2015	digital download	
