= Jessica Robinson (performer) =

English singer & actress (born 1991)

- Born: 28 November 1991 (age 34); Middlesbrough, Yorkshire, England
- Other names: Jessica Close, Jessica Daley
- Years active: 2010-present
- Website: www.jessicadaley.co.uk

Jessica Robinson (stage name briefly Jessica Close and now Jessica Daley) is an English singer and actress. Robinson could not use her birth name as a professional UK actress, due to it already being used on the UK stage by another, so she settled on her grandmother's maiden name. Robinson was first noted for her participation in the 2010 BBC talent-search Over the Rainbow, and more recently for performing in stage musicals in the West End, across the UK, and internationally, not least leading Evita in China in 2019.

== Background ==
Robinson was born on November 28, 1991, in Middlesbrough, North Yorkshire.

As a child, Robinson attended St Gabriel's Primary School followed by St Peter's Secondary School, in Middlesbrough.

As a youth Robinson performed as part of the Middlesbrough Youth Theatre in which she played the part of Fantine in Les Misérables, and in 2006 also went on to compete the kids version of Stars in Their Eyes where she performed as the Australian actress/singer Natalie Imbruglia. Jessica took part in heat four at the 2008 Miss Dance of Great Britain competition.

== Over the Rainbow ==
Robinson took part in Over the Rainbow, a BBC talent-search looking for an actress/singer to play Dorothy Gale in Andrew Lloyd Webber's production of The Wizard of Oz. She advanced to the sixth week, whereupon she was voted off following a sing-off against Danielle Hope, the show's eventual winner.

=== Solo performances ===
	Solo Song
Week one (03/04/10)	"Rehab" (Amy Winehouse)
Week two (10/04/10)	"The Voice Within" (Christina Aguilera)
Week three (17/04/10)	"Crazy Little Thing Called Love" (Queen)
Week four (24/04/10)	"There You'll Be" (Faith Hill)
Week five (01/05/10)	"Cabaret" (from Cabaret)
Week six (08/05/10)	"Supercalifragilisticexpialidocious" (from Mary Poppins)

== After Over the Rainbow ==
Robinson studied at the Arts Educational School. She was lauded for her efforts at raising Middlesbrough's profile and performed at the 2010 Middlesbrough Music Live event with The Wildcats of Kilkenny.

In August 2010 it was announced that Robinson would temporarily take over fellow Over the Rainbow alumna Stephanie Fearon's role in Smokey Joe's Cafe. Robinson performed for three nights in late August while Fearon recovered after an operation.

Continuing to support her hometown's vibrant cultural scene, Robinson took the title role in the Christmas 2011 pantomime "Snow White" at Middlesbrough Little Theatre, and in April 2012 she starred in the video for Middlesbrough-based band Collectors Club's debut single, First to Know.

Robinson performed in Mamma Mia! on London's West End as Ali.

Robinson was part of the cast of Les Misérables Dubai.

In 2019, Robinson starred as Eva Perón on the Evita International Tour, starting in China; a role she subsequently reprised, travelling 150 miles at less than 8 hours notice and thus saving the show at the Leicester Curve Theatre in January 2024.
