= Under the Thumb =

2003 single by Amy Studt

Single by Amy Studt

from the album False Smiles
- B-side: "False Smiles"; "Rose"
- Released: 29 September 2003
- Length: 3:45
- Label: 19; Polydor
- Songwriters: Amy Studt; Karen Poole; David Eriksen
- Producer: David Eriksen

Amy Studt singles chronology
"Misfit" (2003)	"Under the Thumb" (2003)	"All I Wanna Do" (2004)

"Under the Thumb" is the third single from English singer Amy Studt's debut album, False Smiles (2003). Released on 29 September 2003, the song reached number 10 on the UK Singles Chart and number 36 in Ireland.

== Music video ==
The video tells the story of a young woman who has got her boyfriend (Iddo Goldberg) on a 'short leash'. In the beginning she is seen carrying shopping walking along a country road. She goes into her cottage and her boyfriend is tied up to a chair. At various stages in the video she is seen doing things for him like feeding him and washing his hair. There are newspaper articles around the house with their pictures in and they are on the TV, which makes out they are missing. The police come knocking on the door but think no-one is there and leave. Then Amy starts destroying her room, and in the end she lets her boyfriend leave the house, and she locks the door behind her.

== Track listings ==
UK and Australian CD single

1. "Under the Thumb" – 3:44
2. "False Smiles" – 3:52
3. "Rose" – 4:27
4. "Under the Thumb" (video)

UK cassette single

1. "Under the Thumb" – 3:44
2. "False Smiles" – 3:52
3. "Rose" – 4:27

== Charts ==
Chart (2003)	Peak position
Ireland (IRMA)	36
Scotland Singles (Official Charts)	8
UK Singles (Official Charts)	10

== Release history ==
Region	Date	Format(s)	Label(s)	Ref.
United Kingdom	29 September 2003	CD; cassette	19; Polydor	
Australia	27 October 2003	CD	19; Polydor	
