= St Gregory's Catholic Science College =

Location
- Donnington Road; Kenton; London, HA3 0NB; England; 51.58361°N 0.30494°W

Information
- Type: Academy
- Religious affiliation: Roman Catholic
- Local authority: Harrow
- Trust: All Saints' Trust
- Department for Education URN: 142560 Tables
- Ofsted: Reports
- Headteacher: Madeleine Moran
- Gender: Coeducational
- Age: 11 to 18
- Houses: Augustine, Benedict, Bernadette, Hume, Joseph, Mary
- Website: http://www.stgregorys.harrow.sch.uk/

St Gregory's Catholic Science College is a coeducational Roman Catholic secondary school and sixth form located in the Kenton area of the London Borough of Brent, England. It is located near the border of the London Borough of Harrow, and accepts pupils from both boroughs.

The school has had great success in recent years, offering highly valued GCSE's such as statistics and business studies, led by Jagdish Kaffle, resulting with most of its students achieving 70% A-A*.

Although predominantly Roman Catholic, the school accepts some pupils from other religions too, But mainly followers of Catholicism. All pupils must swear on the bible as the initiation process, regardless the religion. This has sparked an internal conflict between Senior Leadership Teams.

Previously a voluntary aided school, in January 2016 St Gregory's Catholic Science College converted to academy status and is now sponsored by the All Saints' Trust.

In 2023, the school was found to have potentially structurally unsound buildings due to the use of reinforced autoclaved aerated concrete as a building material.

== Notable former pupils ==
- Stephanie Fearon (b. 1989) – actress
- Ricky German (b. 1999) – footballer
- Luke Mbete (b. 2003) – footballer
- Anna Georgette Gilford (b. 1981) – singer / songwriter
