= Middlesbrough Theatre =

Theatre in Linthorpe, Middlesbrough, England

- Interactive map of Middlesbrough Theatre
- Address: The Avenue; Middlesbrough; United Kingdom
- Coordinates: 54.55488°N 1.24061°W
- Owner: Middlesbrough Council
- Capacity: 484

Construction
- Opened: 7.15pm Monday 21st October 1957

Website
- http://www.middlesbroughtheatre.co.uk/

Middlesbrough Theatre (formerly the Little Theatre) is a theatre in Middlesbrough, England, which was opened by Sir John Gielgud in 1957 and was one of the first new theatres built in England after the Second World War.

== History ==
The history of Middlesbrough Theatre begins with the closure of the Opera house in the 1920s and its conversion to the Gaumont cinema in the 1920s.

It was, in the main, the Opera House which provided the town and district with drama and opera, and it was a tragedy far surpassing any that appeared on its stage when the decision was made to close it down. Middlesbrough could not merely travel to Stockton to satisfy its longing for the drama, for much the same process had been busy there and the closing of the Opera House bereaved a vast area with a massive population of all opportunity for participating in one of the oldest arts of mankind. As the Middlesbrough Opera House lay dying, Miss Leah Bateman of the Macdona Players gave advice as follows: "Keep the legitimate stage alive in your town by every means in your power. The stage is not yet dead, it is temporarily submerged by a wave of celluloid from the west. With the help of good, well-managed amateur societies the torch can be kept burning until such time as the theatre will once more take its rightful place in a society of thinking people." (from the programme for Our Town 1948).

In response, representatives from over forty dramatic societies met in 1923 to consider forming a company to keep live theatre active in the area.

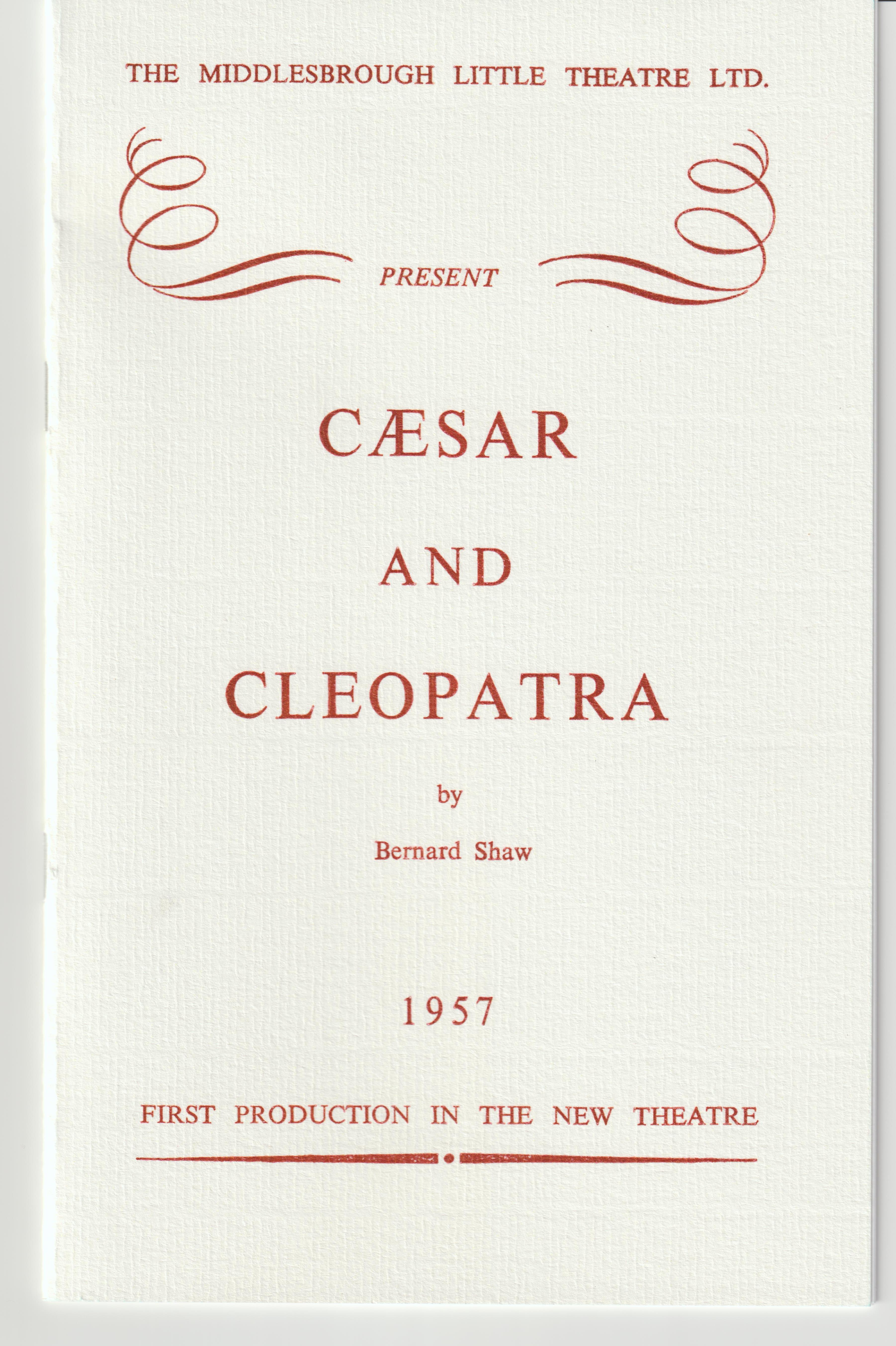
Caesar and Cleopatra programme (1957)

As a result, a town's meeting was held on 5 February 1930 and a large committee elected which met for the first time on 24 April. From these members, 10 were chosen to be the first committee of Middlesbrough Little Theatre. In the immediate post-war years the society decided to commission its own auditorium, entrusting the finance and fund-raising to founding treasurer John Berriman. The resulting theatre, now known as the Middlesbrough Theatre, was the first purpose-built playhouse to be built in Britain after the Second World War: it was ceremonially opened by John Gielgud on 22 October 1957 with a production of 'Caesar and Cleopatra'.

On 17 July 1996, when, following a feasibility study by Richard Bell, a recommendation was made to change its name to Middlesbrough Theatre. Today, the theatre continues as a charitable trust, with Middlesbrough Council as sole trustee.

In November 2014, it was announced by Middlesbrough council that as part of a £12 million spending plan on the town, £700,000 is to be allocated to improving the theatre with increased seating and an improvement in the suitability of the venue.

== 50th birthday ==
Middlesbrough Theatre's 50th anniversary was on 21 October 2007, a Golden Anniversary Gala Concert was held and a souvenir programme was produced.

== Middlesbrough Youth Theatre ==
Middlesbrough Youth Theatre is an umbrella company consisting of Middlesbrough Junior Theatre, earlier known as MLT Juniors (aged 11–16), together with a 'Kidstage' group of 7- to 10-year-olds, and an older 'Youth Theatre' of 17- to 25-year-olds.

The company performs in Middlesbrough Theatre, and has run for many years with many of its members continuing to work in drama and the performing arts. The group is a member of the National Association of Youth Theatres (NAYT). The company has also taken part in the Edinburgh Fringe, and is a regular at the Middlesbrough Youth Drama Festival.

== Other uses ==
The Theatre has in the past served as a venue for music, including a performance by jazz violinist Stephane Grappelli in the late 1970s, and as a member of the network of local Film Theatres associated with the National Film Theatre.
