= False Smiles =

Studio album by Amy Studt
- Released: 30 June 2003
- Recorded: 2001–2003
- Genre: Pop, pop punk, alternative rock
- Length: 46:39
- Label: Polydor

Amy Studt chronology
False Smiles (2003)	My Paper Made Men (2008)

Singles from False Smiles
- 1. "Just a Little Girl" Released: 1 July 2002; 2. "Misfit" Released: 9 June 2003; 3. "Under the Thumb" Released: 29 September 2003; 4. "All I Wanna Do" Released: 12 January 2004

Professional ratings
Review scores
Source	Rating
allmusic	4/5 stars
RTÉ	4/5 stars
entertainment.ie	3/5 stars
Guardian Unlimited	4/5 stars

False Smiles is the debut album from British singer Amy Studt. Originally released in 2003 with 14 tracks, the album was re-released on 26 January 2004 with the new single, a cover of the Sheryl Crow classic "All I Wanna Do". It sold around 200,000 copies and was certified gold.

== Track listing ==
Standard
No.	Title	Writer(s)	Length
1.	"Just a Little Girl"	Amy Studt, Yak Bondy	3:42
2.	"Misfit"	Amy Studt, David Eriksen, Karen Ann Poole	3:28
3.	"Under the Thumb"	Amy Studt, David Eriksen, Karen Ann Poole	3:45
4.	"All I Wanna Do"	Bill Bottrell, David Baerwald, Kevin Gilbert, Sheryl Crow, Wyn Cooper	3:57
5.	"If Only"	Amy Studt, Rob Davis	3:50
6.	"Beautiful Lie"	Amy Studt, David Eriksen, Mariette Hansson	4:27
7.	"Ladder in My Tights"	Amy Studt, David Eriksen, Karen Ann Poole	3:00
8.	"Carry Me Away"	Amy Studt, Fridrik Karlsson, Yak Bondy	3:55
9.	"Happy Now"	Amy Studt, Yak Bondy	4:07
10.	"Gonna Be Fine"	Amy Studt, Pete Lewinson, Steve Lewinson	5:20
11.	"Superior Mind"	Amy Studt, David Eriksen	3:49
12.	"Going Out of My Mind"	Amy Studt, Pete Lewinson, Steve Lewinson	3:40
13.	"Seconds Away"	Amy Studt, Cathy Dennis	3:54
14.	"Testify"	Amy Studt, Eliot Kennedy, Gary Barlow, Tim Woodcock	3:22
15.	"Nobody"	Amy Studt, Yak Bondy	3:45

== Charts ==
Chart (2003)	Peak position
UK Albums Chart	18
