= Honey G (rapper) =

English rapper

- Born: Anna Georgette Gilford; 12 March 1981 (age 45); Harrow, London, England
- Genres: Hip hop; comedy hip hop
- Occupation: Rapper
- Instrument: Vocals
- Years active: 2016–present
- Label: Syco

Anna Georgette Gilford (born 12 March 1981), professionally known as Honey G, is an English rapper. She was a contestant on the thirteenth series of The X Factor in 2016 and became the eighth contestant eliminated.

== Personal life ==
Honey G is Jewish and has said she has been bullied with antisemitism all her life. She attended St Gregory's Catholic Science College in Kenton, before going on to Salford University and graduated with an upper second-class degree in music in 2004. In July 2017, she came out as a lesbian.

== Career ==
=== 2016: The X Factor ===
In her first audition, she sang "Work It" by Missy Elliott, which earned her three yes votes. At the six-chair challenge, she sang "WTF (Where They From)" by Missy Elliott and Pharrell Williams, and was eliminated by mentor Sharon Osbourne; however, Osbourne brought her back as a replacement for Ivy Grace Paredes, who was unable to travel to Los Angeles due to visa issues. Osbourne later picked Honey G to advance after her performance of Coolio's "Gangsta's Paradise". She ended up in the bottom two for the first time against Ryan Lawrie on week 7. Cowell, Osbourne and Walsh voted to save her. However voting statistics revealed that Lawrie received more votes than Honey G meaning if Walsh sent the result to deadlock, Lawrie would've advanced to the quarter-final and Honey G would've been eliminated. Honey G was in the bottom two in the quarter-final against 5 After Midnight. After the sing-off, only Osbourne voted to send Honey G through to the semi-final, and was the eighth contestant eliminated.

During her time in the competition, Honey G faced criticism for being a novelty act, branded such by judge Nicole Scherzinger. Isabel Mohan of The Telegraph gave her the title of "the biggest joke in X Factor history."

She performed at The X Factor Final at Wembley Arena as a guest performer where she officially announced that she had signed a record deal with Cowell's record label, Syco Music, and would be releasing her debut single, "The Honey G Show", on 23 December. The single received little promotion and reached number 149 on the UK Singles Chart.

The X Factor performances and results
Show	Song choice	Theme	Result
Auditions	"Work It" – Missy Elliott	—N/a	Through to bootcamp
Bootcamp	"Creep" – TLC	—N/a	Through to six-chair challenge
Six-chair challenge	"WTF (Where They From)" – Missy Elliott feat. Pharrell Williams	—N/a	Eliminated, put through to judges' houses as Ivy-Grace Paredes replacement
Judges' houses	"Gangsta's Paradise" – Coolio feat. L.V.	—N/a	Through to live shows
Live show 1	"California Love" - 2Pac feat. Dr. Dre & Roger Troutman	Express Yourself	Safe (4th)
Live show 2	"Mo Money Mo Problems" – The Notorious B.I.G. feat. Puff Daddy & Mase	Motown	Safe (4th)
Live show 3	"Ice Ice Baby"/"Under Pressure" – Vanilla Ice/ Queen feat. David Bowie	Divas & Legends	Safe (5th)
Live show 4	"Men in Black" – Will Smith feat. Coko	Fright Night	Safe (6th)
Live show 5	"Jump" – Kris Kross	Girlband vs Boyband	Safe (5th)
Live show 6	"Stayin' Alive" – Bee Gees/N-Trance	Disco	Safe (5th)
Live show 7	"It's Like That"/ "Gettin' Jiggy wit It" – Run–D.M.C./ Will Smith	Movies	Bottom two (6th)
Live show 7	"Get Ur Freak On"/ "Work It" – Missy Elliott	Sing-off	Safe (majority vote)
Quarter-Final	"U Can't Touch This"/"Super Freak" – MC Hammer/Rick James	Louis Loves	Bottom two (5th)
Quarter-Final	"Push It"/ "Black Beatles" – Salt-N-Pepa/Rae Sremmurd feat. Gucci Mane	Contestant's Choice	Bottom two (5th)
Quarter-Final	"California Love" – 2Pac feat. Dr. Dre and Roger Troutman	Sing-off	Eliminated (fifth place)
Final (guest performer)	"Men In Black"/"Ice Ice Baby"/"Jump"/"The Honey G Show" — Will Smith feat. Coko/Vanilla Ice/Kris Kross/Honey G	—N/a	N/A

=== Post-X Factor career ===
Since parting company with Syco Music in 2017, Honey G has self-published music videos on her own Vevo page, and worked as an estate agent.

In 2022, she appeared on series seven of Celebrity Coach Trip.
