= Middlesbrough Youth Theatre =

Theatrical group in Northern England

Middlesbrough Youth Theatres (MYT) is an umbrella company consisting of Middlesbrough Junior Theatre, earlier known as MLT Juniors (aged 11–16), together with a 'Kidstage' group of 7- to 11-year-olds, and an older 'Youth Theatre' of 11- to 18-year-olds. The largest section of the company is the Juniors, a group originally created in 1956.

The company performs in Middlesbrough Theatre, and many of its former members continue to work in drama and the performing arts. The group is a member of the National Association of Youth Theatres (NAYT). The company has also taken part in the Edinburgh Fringe, and is a regular at the Middlesbrough Youth Drama Festival. Several full-length musicals have been written especially for the company and all have been performed on the professional stage at the Middlesbrough Theatre.

== Show history ==
1995–2000	2001–2005	2006–2010	2011–2015	2016–2020	2021–2026
1995 – Oliver!; 1996 – Alice in Wonderland; 1997 – Bugsy Malone; 1998 – Ernie's Incredible Illucinations; 1998 – Two Daft Lasses in a Boat; 1998 – The Future is in Eggs (or It Takes All Sorts to Make a World); 1998 – Oh! What A Lovely War; 1999 – Guys and Dolls; 2000 – The Infant Hercules; 2000 – Cat in the Road; 2000 – Dream Jobs; 2000 – Peter Pan; 2000 – Twelfth Night	2001 – Whistle Down the Wind; 2001 – A Midsummer Night's Dream; 2001 – Cat in the Road; 2001 – Two Daft Lasses in a Boat; 2001 – Scrooge: The Musical; 2002 – Dressing the Wound; 2002 – Spectrum 6; 2002 – Santa Claus: The Musical; 2003 – Oliver!; 2003 – A Midsummer Night's Dream; 2003 – Alice in Wonderland; 2003 – The Lion, the Witch and the Wardrobe; 2004 – Les Misérables (Reviews); 2005 – West Side Story	2007 – Titanic: The Musical; 2007 – Les Misérables; 2008 – A Tribute to Andrew Lloyd Webber; 2008 – Pendragon; 2009 – Kes; 2009 – Scrooge: The Musical; 2010 – Wizard of Oz	2011 – Beauty and the Beast; 2012 – Seussical the Musical; 2013 – Miss Saigon; 2014 – Cats; 2014 – The Lion, The Witch & The Wardrobe; 2014 – Les Misérables; 2015 – Footloose	2016 – West Side Story; 2017 – High School Musical; 2017 – DNA; 2018 – Joseph and the Amazing Technicolour Dreamcoat; 2018 – Rent; 2019 – Half a Sixpence; 2019 – Jesus Christ Superstar; 2020 – Blood Brothers	2022 – Cats; 2022 – Alice in Wonderland Jr (Kidstage); 2022 – Bugsy Malone; 2023 – Everybody's Talking About Jamie; 2023 – Aladdin Jr (Kidstage); 2023 – Spring Awakening; 2023 – Elf; 2024 – Les Miserables; 2025 – Footloose; 2026 – We Will Rock You

== The Group ==
The longest running section of the group itself was its "Juniors"; MLT Juniors being the group's official name until 2002. The "Juniors" typically has a membership of around 100, ageing from around 13 to 16 (although this age limit often changed). The older "Youth" group has around twenty members. The "Kidstage" theatre group brought about a new beginning for MLT Ltd as it took on a separate group of up to 30 pre-secondary school children.

The company is managed by 'leaders', consisting of both professional and amateur actors, dancers and singers. As a company, there are also directors, an administrator and a treasurer. These members of staff are often the directors, musical directors or backstage crew of the productions. The backstage, costuming and rehearsal crew itself is usually made up of volunteers, with professional lighting and sound crews, and occasionally an orchestra, being the only part of each production that does not come from within the 'group'.

Some limited special effects were made use of during MLTJ performances, including notably splurge guns during 'Bugsy Malone', indoor fireworks during 'Santa Claus: The Musical' and a flying sequence during 'Peter Pan'.

=== The Leaders ===
Here is a partial list of some of the leaders who have worked with Middlesbrough Youth Theatre;

- Ray Burton
- Wendy lowe
- Steve Cockerline
- Mike Crooks
- Darren Gamble
- Bobbie Jameson
- Janice Carmo
- Jack McBride
- Matthew McGuiness
- Lewis Oliver
- Mark Reed
- Helen Roberts
- Kenny Robinson
- Christopher Train
- Ray Tye
- Jane Lester-Bourne
- Georgie Sanderson
- Jean Scarlet-Carr
- Natalie O'Brian
- Vicki Tindale
- Paul Mason
- Tim Jasper
- David Tuffnell
- Sam Readman
- Jessica Mouland
- Lucy Patchett
- Chloe Allport

=== Rehearsals & Performances ===
The group rehearses in several venues in Middlesbrough, north-east England, with productions staged in the town's Middlesbrough Theatre. The theatre itself seats 484 people, and was the first theatre to be built in Britain after World War II. The company now rehearse at Toft House Middlesbrough but use The Scout Hut ( Tollesby Road ) for weekly workshops.

=== Middlesbrough Little Theatre Ltd. ===
Middlesbrough Youth Theatre was affiliated with MLT Ltd., which was born in 1930, and whose productions, although sometimes directed by professionals, were performed almost always by amateurs. Their first play, "To What Red Hell", by Percy Robinson, was presented in November 1930 in the Church Hall of St. John's. The company occupied this stage for twenty-seven years, until in 1945 a new theatre was proposed using money from the Building Fund. Complications meant that, as well as the cost rising to three times the original estimate, the Middlesbrough Theatre did not open until 1957.

The theatre was opened by Sir John Gielgud, and its opening production was a lavish presentation of 'Caesar and Cleopatra'. The Theatre was handed over to the local council in 1972 due to rising maintenance costs, but MLT Ltd, the resident amateur company, still resides there, staging around 2–4 shows each year.

=== Previous Members ===
Previous members of MYT have gone onto careers in the performing arts. The following internet links are to other websites concerning some of these people.

- Mark Benton, Actor
- Peter Gordon, Actor
- Lisa Newton, Costume Designer
- Jessica Robinson, Singer/Actress
- Natasha Ferguson, Singer/Actress – UK & Ireland Tour of Wicked (1st Cover 'Nessa Rose')
- Matthew Dale, Singer/Actor – UK & Ireland Tour of Billy Elliot (1st Cover 'Tony')
- Rachel Chisholm, Actress
- Alistair Chisholm, Actor
- Neil Grainger, Actor
- Graham Martin, Actor – UK Tour of Blood Brothers & Starlight Express West End Alumni
- Jessica Brady, Actress and singer-BGT semi finalist with girl group 'The Honeybuns'
