= Misfit (Amy Studt song) =

2003 single by Amy Studt

Single by Amy Studt

from the album False Smiles
- B-side: "Queen A"; "Put Your Faith in Me"
- Released: 9 June 2003
- Length: 3:29
- Label: Polydor; 19
- Songwriters: Amy Studt; Karen Poole; David Eriksen
- Producer: David Eriksen

Amy Studt singles chronology
"Just a Little Girl" (2002)	"Misfit" (2003)	"Under the Thumb" (2003)

"Misfit" is a song by English singer Amy Studt, released as the second single from her debut album, False Smiles (2003), on 9 June 2003. The song reached number six on the UK Singles Chart and is Studt's most successful single to date. It was also her most successful single internationally, peaking within the top 50 in Australia, Ireland, the Netherlands, and Sweden.

== Chart performance ==
"Misfit" is Studt's most successful single in the UK and internationally, debuting at number six on the UK Singles Chart and staying in the top 75 for 10 weeks. Internationally, "Misfit" reached number 11 in the Netherlands, number 17 in Ireland, number 32 in Sweden, and number 48 in Australia.

== Music video ==
The video was directed by Sophie Muller, who directed the video for her last single Just a Little Girl, and produced by Dawn Rose. The video was filmed at Eagle Rock High School in Los Angeles, California. American actress Danielle Panabaker appears in the video as a schoolgirl.

The video begins with Amy walking to school, before getting tripped up and pushed around when she gets in. She flees to the bathroom, and then imagines herself performing. Then she is shown in a dormitory with her in a nightdress. All the girls are crowding around her, and she doesn't seem to like it so she climbs on top of a cupboard. She is then shown dancing with some other girls imagining herself to be like everybody else, which clearly displeases her. Then she proceeds to dance by herself in her own unique way, until some people in suits drive up to the school, presumably talent scouts, see her and start shooting pictures with her, and the other girls are seen to be crying. At the end she is seen back on top of the cupboard smiling.

== Track listings ==
UK and Australian CD single

1. "Misfit" – 3:28
2. "Queen A" – 3:40
3. "Put Your Faith in Me" – 4:23
4. "Misfit" (video) – 3:28

UK cassette single and European CD single

1. "Misfit" – 3:28
2. "Put Your Faith in Me" – 4:23

== Charts ==
=== Weekly charts ===
Chart (2003)	Peak position
Australia (ARIA)	48
Europe (Eurochart Hot 100)	21
Ireland (IRMA)	17
Netherlands (Dutch Top 40)	11
Netherlands (Single Top 100)	32
Scotland Singles (Official Charts)	7
Sweden (Sverigetopplistan)	32
UK Singles (Official Charts)	6

=== Year-end charts ===
Chart (2003)	Position
UK Singles (OCC)	142

== Release history ==
Region	Date	Format(s)	Label(s)	Ref.
United Kingdom	9 June 2003	CD; cassette	19; Polydor	
Australia	21 July 2003	CD	19; Polydor	
