= St Peter and St Paul's Catholic Voluntary Academy =

Location
- Western Avenue; Lincoln, Lincolnshire, LN6 7SX; England; 53.2117°N 0.5635°W

Information
- Type: Academy
- Motto: Pro Petro Paulo Patria; For the homeland of Peter and Paul
- Religious affiliation: Roman Catholic
- Established: 1957
- Department for Education URN: 139623 Tables
- Ofsted: Reports
- Head teacher: Caroline Hewerdine
- Gender: Coeducational
- Age: 11 to 18
- Enrolment: 540 students
- Capacity: 628 students
- Houses: Bernadette, Francis, Hugh and Terasa
- Colours: Maroon and Gold
- Website: http://www.sspp.lincs.sch.uk/

St Peter and St Paul's Catholic Voluntary Academy (formerly St Peter and St Paul's Catholic High School) is a coeducational Roman Catholic secondary school and sixth form with academy status, situated in Lincoln, England. It is one of only two Catholic high schools in Lincolnshire and the smallest secondary school in Lincoln.

== History ==
In 1949, Lincoln's two thousand Roman Catholics were told that they needed to raise around £75,000 for alterations to St Hugh's RC school, and for a new secondary modern school in Boultham. The school was built in the late 1950s. When the school opened in 1957, it was very small and could only hold a limited number of pupils; over time the school added additional buildings, and several different subjects were included in the curriculum, such as woodwork and metalwork, but these were dropped through curriculum change.

The official opening was on the afternoon of Wednesday 3 April 1957, with two catholic bishops, and fifty Catholic priests. The Bishop of Salford George Beck gave an address, and the Bishop of Nottingham, Rt Rev Edward Ellis, blessed the interior and exterior with holy water. The chairman of Lincoln Education Committee attended, Mr A.H. Briggs, and the Dean of Lincoln, Rt Rev Colin Dunlop. It was built by M J Gleeson, with a local office at Hykeham Hall, in North Hykeham. It cost £63,000. It had five classrooms and three practical rooms, for 150 children.

A new church, costing £50,000, was planned to be built; the school hall took the place of a catholic church on Sundays, in the 1960s. The £80,000 church opened at Christmas 1967, with the first priest, 41-year-old Peter Tierney, arriving from Swadlincote in September 1968; he came from Leicester, having attended Wyggeston Grammar School for Boys. The new RC church was consecrated on 12 September 1968 by Archbishop Igino Eugenio Cardinale, of the Apostolic Nunciature to Great Britain.

=== Academy status ===
On 1 May 2013, the school announced its conversion to academy status, becoming part of the St Gilbert of Sempringham Catholic Academy Trust and being renamed as St Peter and St Paul's Catholic Voluntary Academy.

=== Multi-Academy Trusts ===
Since acquiring academy status in 2013, the academy has been part of several Multi-Academy Trusts:

- St Gilbert of Sempringham Catholic Academy Trust (May 2013 - September 2018)
- St Thérèse of Lisieux Catholic Multi Academy Trust (September 2018 - June 2022)
- Our Lady of Lourdes Catholic Multi Academy Trust (June 2022 – Present)

== Buildings ==
The school opened within one building. Buildings were added, the first being a set of typing huts, but these were replaced with an ICT and Maths building called The Annex Block. Other buildings included a Science building, Sports Hall and, most recently, an English and Performing Arts centre. There were temporary units such as The Magdalene Centre, chiefly used for special needs and general education; it was demolished in 2008. The T Blocks, used for extra classrooms, remained after other units were demolished, but these were removed in 2011. Three years after The Magdalene Centre was demolished and a new learning support centre, 'The Newman Centre', was built, however, this later was used as a staff building, and the learning support centre moved to the Gavin Hinds centre.

== School houses ==
Originally there were four houses. Each was named after a saint: Bernadette, Teresa, Hugh and Francis. Teresa House was discontinued in 2010 due to a lack of pupils and was later re-introduced in 2021. In addition to being named after various saints, each house has been assigned a colour, with Bernadette assigned the colour yellow , Hugh red , Francis blue and Teresa green .

== Notable alumni ==
- Amy Diamond (b. 1988) - actress, singer, glamour model
- Sam Clucas (b. 1990) - professional footballer, Rotherham United F.C.
