= Lauren Samuels =

English singer and actress (born 1988)

- Born: Lauren Bonner; 26 March 1988 (age 38); Nuneaton, Warwickshire, England
- Occupations: Actress and singer
- Years active: 2010–present
- Website: Page at BBC

Lauren Alvarado (born 26 March 1988) is an English singer and actress who performs under the stage name "Lauren Samuels". She became well known to the British public as a contestant on the 2010 BBC UK TV series Over the Rainbow. Since appearing on the show, she has gone on to appear in West End theatre, including playing the lead role of Sandy in Grease.

== Background ==
Samuels married David Alvarado in 2021. Her maiden name is Lauren Bonner, but she adopted the stage name Lauren Samuels for her elder brother, Samuel. She started ballet lessons at age two, began private tutorials at the Hinckley Speech and Drama Studio at seven and started singing lessons at thirteen. She studied Performing Arts at Stratford-upon-Avon College, was a member of Youth Music Theatre UK in 2005 and also studied at the Guildford School of Acting, graduating in 2009.

== Over the Rainbow ==
Samuels was a contestant on the 2010 BBC show Over the Rainbow: a talent contest to find an actress to play Dorothy in a West End revival of The Wizard of Oz. Samuels made it through to the final eleven girls who would compete for the public vote through individual performances. Despite coming in the bottom two for votes on three occasions, Samuels made it through to the final, where she ultimately came third to runner-up Sophie Evans and winner Danielle Hope.

=== Solo performances ===
	Solo Song
Week one (03/04/10)	"Run" (Snow Patrol)
Week two (10/04/10)	"I'll Never Fall in Love Again" (from Promises, Promises)
Week three (17/04/10)	"Sway" (Dean Martin)
Week four (24/04/10)	"Nobody Knows" (Pink)
Week five (01/05/10)	"The Man that Got Away" (from A Star Is Born)
Week six (08/05/10)	"Being Alive" (from Company)
Week seven (semi-final) (15 May 2010)	"Heaven" (Bryan Adams)
Week eight (final) (22 May 2010)	"I Could Have Danced All Night" (from My Fair Lady)

== Discography ==
Samuels, along with the other two finalists of Over the Rainbow, recorded a version of "Over the Rainbow" with the intention of the eventual winner's song being made available for purchase shortly after the finale. Hope's recording was originally the only version released, but both Evans' and Samuels' versions of the song were ultimately made available for download on 6 June 2010. She also appeared with the other contestants in a Wizard of Oz medley featured as a b-side on the CD single of Hope's "Over the Rainbow." Samuels also recorded "Someone You'd Be Proud Of" for the concept album of "The In-Between". The album was released in early 2012. In 2017 she recorded two songs for the album Wit & Whimsy - Songs by Alexander S. Bermange (one solo and one featuring all of the album's 23 artists), which reached No. 1 in the iTunes comedy album chart.

In 2021, Samuels, alongside former Over the Rainbow finalist Sophie Evans, recorded and released a joint album entitled 'Chasing Rainbows, Finding Judy', which is dedicated to celebrating the life of Judy Garland.

In 2022, Samuels began hosting her own podcast entitled 'A Brit in LA', which sees her interviewing successful people throughout the Hollywood entertainment industry.

== Stage ==
Samuels' first major stage role was playing Wendy in a 2009-2010 production of Peter Pan at the Curve, Leicester.

On 26 July 2010, she made her West End debut as Sandy in the London production of Grease, replacing Siobhan Dillon. She played Cathy in a production of the two-character musical The Last Five Years, which ran at the Tabard Theatre, Chiswick from 9 February to 5 March 2011.

Samuels played the role of Scaramouche in We Will Rock You at the Dominion Theatre in London from late 2011. Following this she starred as the title character in Vampirette the Musical at the Manchester Opera House in May 2012. She reprised her role in We Will Rock You for its 10th anniversary tour, which commenced on 25 February 2012.

In June 2015, Samuels played the role of Jules, in the new West End musical Bend It Like Beckham.

In May 2024, Samuels played Elphaba on the US National Tour of Wicked.

In 2026, Samuels played Meg on the 2026 World Tour of The Last Ship.

=== Stage Credits ===
Year(s)	Production	Role	Theatre	Location
2009-10	Peter Pan	Wendy	Curve	Leicester
2010-11	Grease	Sandy	Piccadilly Theatre	West End
2011	The Last Five Years	Cathy	Tabard Theatre	Chiswick
2011-13	We Will Rock You	Scaramouche	Dominion Theatre	West End
2012	Vampirette the Musical	The Vampirette	Manchester Opera House	Manchester
2013	The Wizard of Oz	Dorothy Gale	Pantheon Theatre	Cyprus
2014	The Water Babies	Ellie	Curve	Leicester
2014	Love Story	Jenny Cavilleri	Octagon Theatre	Bolton
2014-15	The Busker's Opera	Polly Peachum	Park Theatre	London
2015-16	Bend It Like Beckham	Jules	Phoenix Theatre	West End
2016	Children of Eden	Eve	Prince of Wales Theatre	West End
2017	La Ronde	Various	The Bunker	Southwark
2017-18	Romantics Anonymous	Mimi / Young Woman	Sam Wanamaker Playhouse	London
2018	A Hundred Words For Snow	Rory	Arcola Theatre	Off-West End
2018	The Big Corner	Jenny	The Octagon Theatre	Bolton
2019	Henry V	Katharine	Barn Theatre	Cirencester
2019-20	Cinderella	Cinderella	Lyric Hammersmith	London
2021-22	Groan Ups	Katie	Mischief Theatre	UK Tour
2024-25	Wicked	Elphaba	North American Tour	
2026	The Last Ship	Meg	2026 World Tour	Amsterdam, Paris, Brisbane, New York City, West End
