= Sophie Evans (performer) =

Welsh singer & actress (born 1993)

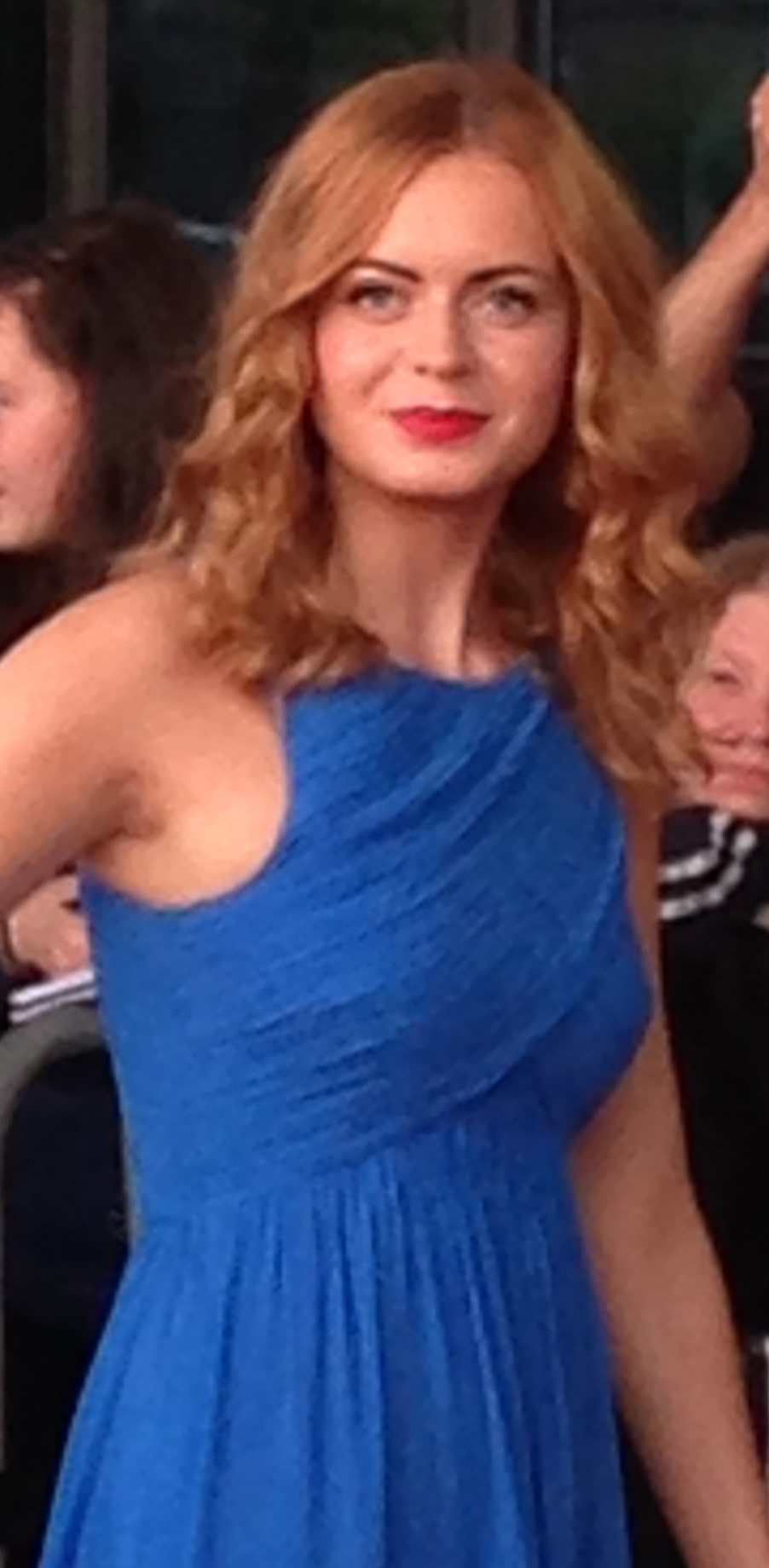
- Born: Sophie Gwen Evans; 13 February 1993 (age 33); Tonypandy, Wales, United Kingdom
- Occupations: Singer, actress
- Years active: 2010–present
- Spouse: Ellis Jenkins (m. 2022)
- Children: 2

Sophie Gwen Jenkins (née Evans; born 13 February 1993) is a Welsh singer and actress from Tonypandy. She played Glinda in the West End production of Wicked (2017) and Dorothy in the 2011 musical The Wizard of Oz.

As a child, Evans performed with the Mid-Rhondda Operatic Society. After several television appearances in her teens, she achieved wider notice as the runner-up on the 2010 BBC talent show Over the Rainbow. Evans made her West End debut in March 2011 as the alternate Dorothy in Andrew Lloyd Webber's production of The Wizard of Oz. From February to September 2012, she played Dorothy full-time.

== Early life ==
Evans was born and raised in the Rhondda Valley. Her parents, David and Michelle Evans and her younger sister Beth, live in Tonypandy, where Evans attended Tonypandy Community College as a sixth-form student.

She appeared in school plays and musicals, and featured in a Joshua Foundation Show at the Millennium Centre, Cardiff. Evans was also a member of the Mid-Rhondda Operatic Society from a young age to her early teens. She appeared on the 2008 series of ITV's The X Factor. Her other television appearances include The Big Performance (CBBC), The Big Talent Show (S4C) and a centenary documentary about the Tonypandy riots (BBC Wales).

== Over the Rainbow ==
Evans auditioned for Over the Rainbow, a reality show in which young actress/singers competed to play the role of Dorothy Gale in Andrew Lloyd Webber's 2011 production of The Wizard of Oz. She advanced to the final along with Danielle Hope and Lauren Samuels. The final aired in two parts on 22 May 2010. Hope was the declared the winner and Evans the runner-up.

=== Solo performances ===
	Solo Song
Week one (03/04/10)	"If I Were a Boy" (Beyoncé Knowles)
Week two (10/04/10)	"That Don't Impress Me Much" (Shania Twain)
Week three (17 April 2010)	"I'm with You" (Avril Lavigne)
Week four (24 April 2010)	"Love Song" (Sara Bareilles)
Week five (01/05/10)	"What a Wonderful World" (Louis Armstrong)
Week six (08/05/10)	"I Enjoy Being a Girl" (from Flower Drum Song)
Week seven (semi-final) (15 May 2010)	"Reflection" (from Mulan)
Week eight (final) (22 May 2010)	"Tomorrow" (from Annie)

=== Aftermath ===
Lloyd Webber elected to assist Evans, with the aid of casting director Bill Kenwright, to start her professional career, funding her continued training as a performer at a one-year musical theatre course at the Arts Educational Schools in Chiswick, London. In autumn 2010, Lloyd Webber cast Evans as the "alternate" Dorothy in The Wizard of Oz, to give Hope a rest on Tuesday evenings.

In November 2010, WalesOnline named Evans as the 5th sexiest woman in Wales. Evans joined Only Men Aloud! on the Cardiff dates of their December 2010 tour.

== 2011–present ==
On 8 March 2011, Evans made her professional stage debut as the alternate Dorothy in The Wizard of Oz, appearing on Tuesday evenings and covering the role during Hope's illnesses and holiday weeks in May and September 2011. At first hiding her red hair under a brunette wig, Evans was later given permission by Lloyd Webber to show her natural hair in the role. The Oxford Times reviewed the production during Evans's first full week as Dorothy (in May 2011) replacing the vacationing Hope and wrote of Evans: "Such is her success in the role that it would be hard to imagine anyone could consider they were getting second-best." Another critic commented, "She plays a naive and tender Dorothy who you really want to befriend." A third wrote that she plays "Dorothy perfectly with great vocals in the musical numbers, "Over the Rainbow" was quite magical."

In July 2011, Evans sang as the special guest as part of an Only Boys Aloud! concert in the Parc and Dare Hall, Treorchy. Also in July 2011, Evans participated in a TV reality show filmed in Pembrokeshire, called Cariad@iaith:love4language, in which she and other Welsh celebrities lived together at a campsite for eight days and intensively studied the Welsh language. She has also performed at various charity events. In October 2011, she sang at Millennium Stadium to support the Welsh rugby team in their semi-final match against France in the 2011 Rugby World Cup. Evans sings a duet with Welsh baritone Mark Llewelyn Evans on his debut album Let the Light In, released in November 2011. She is the subject of an ITV Wales documentary about her preparation for, and debut in, The Wizard of Oz, filmed in 2010–2011, called Dare to Dream: The Sophie Evans Journey.

On 7 February 2012, Evans took over the role of Dorothy full-time in the West End production. She remained in The Wizard of Oz until the show closed on 2 September 2012. On 15 April 2012, Evans performed as Dorothy at the 2012 Olivier Awards ceremony at the Royal Opera House in London. The same month, she headlined a concert with the BBC National Orchestra of Wales.

Evans presented and starred in The Really Welsh Christmas Show for BBC Television with the BBC National Orchestra of Wales at the Wales Millennium Centre. Also featuring Michael Ball and Only Boys Aloud, the 45-minute show first aired on BBC One Wales on 19 December 2012. In 2013, Evans starred in the final installment of the "Cornetto Trilogy", The World's End, written by Edgar Wright and Simon Pegg. She later performed at Proms in the Park, in Caerphilly, South Wales.

In early 2014, she was part of an all-star cast performing, Irving Berlin: From Rags to Ritzes, beginning in London and later touring nationwide. Among the songs will be classics such as White Christmas and What'll I Do. She also featured in the 2014 film Pride, directed by Matthew Warchus.

From October 2015 Sophie performed with Lord of the Dance as Erin the Goddess a month run at the Playhouse Theatre, London, a 9-week run at the Lyric Theatre, Broadway and a 6-week American tour finishing a Caesars Palace, Las Vegas for Michael Flately's last performance.

From July 2017, Evans took over the role of Glinda in the West End production of Wicked from Australian actress Suzie Mathers, and as a result became the youngest person to play the role in London, at the age of 24. She starred opposite Alice Fearn as Elphaba.

Evans left Wicked on 20 July 2019, and was replaced by Helen Woolf.

On 2 September 2021, it was announced that Evans would return to the West End production of Wicked as Glinda covering for Helen Woolf who was on maternity leave. She re-opened the production on 15 September 2021, almost 18 months since its closure on 16 March 2020 due to the COVID-19 pandemic lockdown. She will leave the production in January 2022, and will be replaced by Helen Woolf.

== Personal life ==
She and Welsh rugby star Ellis Jenkins had dated since they were teenagers. Sophie and Ellis announced their engagement in 2021. In June 2022, they revealed that Sophie was expecting their first child. They married on 25 June, 2022. Their first child was born in December 2022. A second child was born in April 2025.

== Discography ==
- Evans and the other two finalists of Over the Rainbow each recorded a version of the song "Over the Rainbow", with the intention that the eventual winner's recording would be available for purchase shortly after the finale. Hope's recording was originally the only version released, but both Evans' and Samuels' versions of the song were ultimately made available for download on 6 June 2010.
- Evans released her independent debut album in 2014, The Studio Sessions (Limited Edition), recorded at Acapella Studios, Pentyrch, Wales.
- Evans appears with the other contestants in a Wizard of Oz medley featured as a b-side on the CD single of Hope's "Over the Rainbow".

== Filmography ==
=== Film and television ===
Year	Title	Role	Notes
2011	Cariad@iaith:love4language	Herself	
2011	2011 Rugby World Cup	Herself	Semi Final between Wales v France
2012	The Big Performance	Herself	
2012	Dare to Dream: The Sophie Evans Journey	Herself	Documenting her debut in The Wizard of Oz
2012	BBC'sThe Really Welsh Christmas Show	Host	
2013	The World's End	Becky Salt	Final installment of the Cornetto Trilogy
2013	BBC Proms in the Park	Herself	
2014	Under Milk Wood	Neighbour	TV movie
2014	Pride	Debbie Thomas	Directed by Matthew Warchus
2020	Gangs of London	Young Daughter	TV series (2 episodes)
2022	La diosa reflectante	Sofi	

=== Theatre credits ===
Year	Title	Role	Theatre	Location
2010	Only Men Aloud! Wales Tour	Herself	—N/a	Cardiff
2011–2012	The Wizard of Oz	Alternate Dorothy Gale	London Palladium	West End
2011	Only Men Aloud! in Concert	Herself	Parc and Dare Hall	Treorchy
2012	The Wizard of Oz	Dorothy Gale	London Palladium	West End
2012	BBC National Orchestra of Wales in Concert	Headlining Singer	Wales Millennium Centre	Cardiff
2014	Irving Berlin's From Rags to Riches	Herself	—N/a	International Tour
2015	Lord of the Dance	Erin the Goddess	—N/a	International Tour
2017–2019	Wicked	Glinda	Apollo Victoria Theatre	West End
2021–2022	Wicked	Glinda	Apollo Victoria Theatre	West End
