= David Grindrod =

- Occupation: Casting director
- Years active: 1975–present

David Grindrod is a British theatre and television casting director who primarily works with Andrew Lloyd Webber.

Theatre projects he has participated in include Mamma Mia!, The Phantom of the Opera, Jesus Christ Superstar, Joseph and the Amazing Technicolor Dreamcoat, West Side Story, Saturday Night Fever and Starlight Express.
