= Amy Studt =

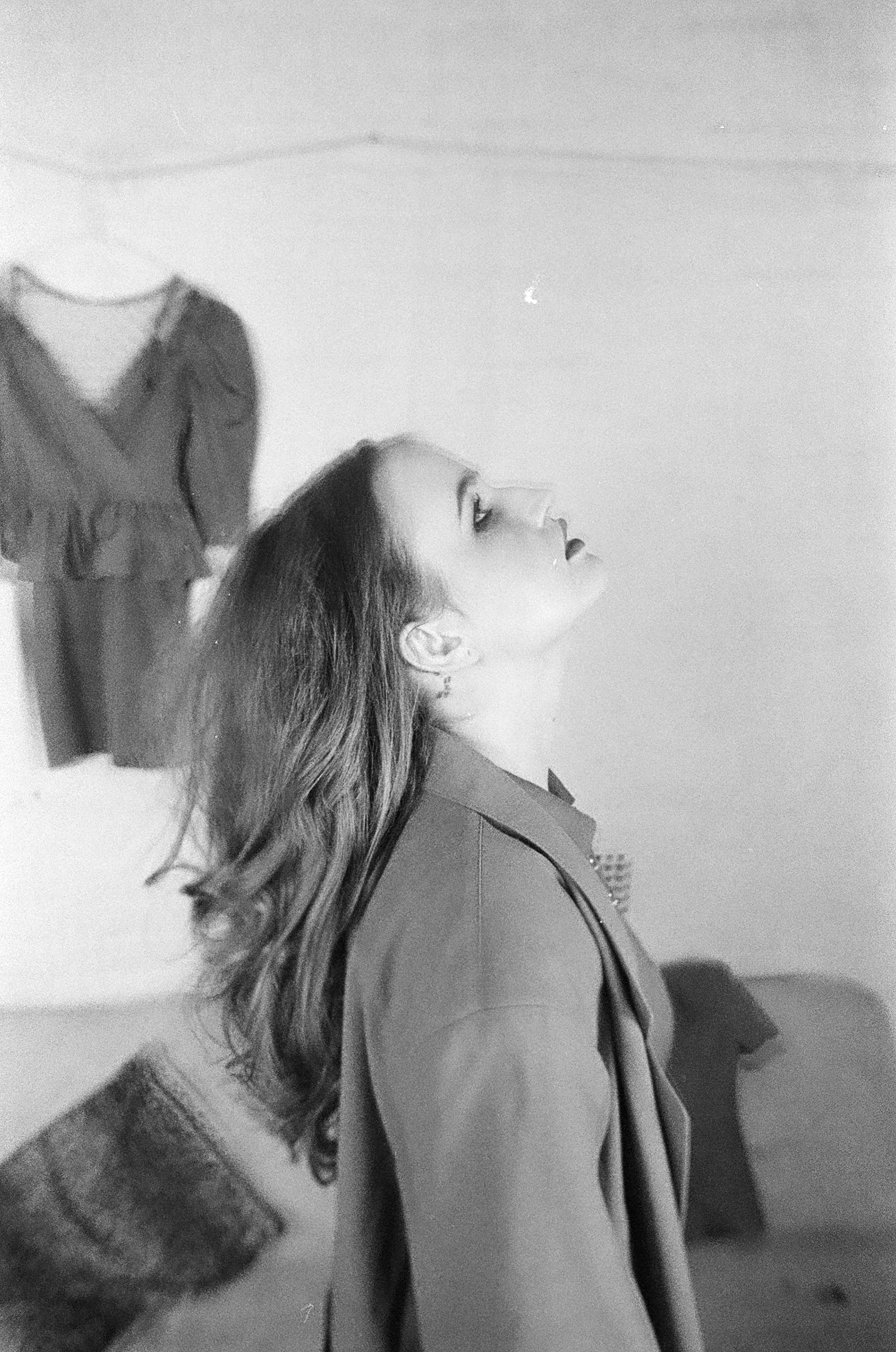
- Studt in 2017

Background information
- Born: 22 March 1986 (age 40); London, England
- Origin: Bournemouth, England
- Genres: Pop, alternative
- Occupations: Singer, songwriter
- Instruments: Vocals, piano, keyboards, guitar, oboe
- Years active: 2002–present
- Labels: Polydor, 19 Entertainment
- Website: www.amystudt.com

Amy Jane Studt (/ˈstʌt/, born 22 March 1986) is an English singer-songwriter and pianist from London and Bournemouth.

Growing up in a musical family, with her father a violinist and conductor who had toured with Roy Orbison, and her mother a pianist, Studt began writing music at the age of six, teaching herself piano, guitar, and oboe. At 12 years old she contracted the rare bone disease osteomyelitis in her hip, leaving her bedridden. Studt used this time for her hobbies, and two years later, with the advice of her father, she recorded her first two demo albums which would go on to get her signed to Polydor. Studt released her first single "Just a Little Girl" in July 2002. The single peaked at number 14 on the UK Singles Chart. It was followed almost a year later by "Misfit", which came to be her highest-charting single, peaking at number six on the UK Singles Chart. That same month, her debut album False Smiles was released, selling over 260,000 copies and being certified Gold. Two more singles were released, "Under the Thumb" in late 2003 and "All I Wanna Do" (a cover of the tune by Sheryl Crow) in early 2004, but only to diminishing sales that prompted Polydor to drop Studt in February 2004, all before her 18th birthday.

From then on until the end of 2006, Studt stayed out of the public eye. But in 2007 it was announced that she was working on a new album, now with the Indie label 19 Entertainment. She released her first single "Furniture", followed by "Chasing the Light"; and the album, My Paper Made Men, was issued on 5 May 2008.

In early 2009, Studt moved to New York City; on her return, she began building a recording studio and continued writing and recording. She went quiet from 2009 to 2017, after suffering a nervous breakdown at 22 years old and being diagnosed with rapid-cycling bipolar disorder and a non-associative anxiety disorder, along with other physical illnesses during her 20s. After three hospitalizations and recovery from addiction, Studt wrote about her experiences with suffering, illness and heartbreak, ‘...but ultimately survival and hope’ which she explains she put into her songwriting for her third album.

In 2017, Studt announced she had been working with Toby Kid from Hatcham Social and released two teaser songs from her soon to come third album, "I Was Jesus in Your Veins" and "Different Colour Pills". The album itself, titled Happiest Girl in the Universe, was released in October 2019.

== History ==
Studt was born in London. Growing up in Bournemouth, Dorset, she started having lessons on the piano, guitar and learning the oboe. Studt's father is a violinist and a conductor who has worked with artists including Roy Robinson, Shirley Bassey and The Beatles (either touring or recording) and has featured in several films, while her mother is a pianist.

In the 1800s, the Studt family brought to the United Kingdom (from Denmark) one of the first steam-run travelling funfairs, The Studt Funfair, which included music, rides, a freak show, and a circus with lion tamers; they were, and still are, a highly regarded showmen family. They were of German and Danish extraction. Amy's father Richard started playing violin at the age of four, and later rejected the family's funfair business to choose a life of music, meeting Amy's mother Delia at Southampton University and going on to lead the London Symphony Orchestra.

Amy struggled with depression, self-harm and being bullied during her teenage years, struggling at school; she attended five different schools before dropping out entirely, at the age of 15, to pursue her music. Her depression led to being diagnosed with chronic fatigue syndrome. At the age of 13, Amy attended Bryanston School, Dorset on a 50% music scholarship by which time Studt had written 42 songs. Her father suggested she record some in a local studio and, she laid them all down live to tape. She gave or sold the finished CD to various friends, with one reaching Simon Fuller (manager of Annie Lennox, the Spice Girls and Amy Winehouse among others) who signed her that same year to both his own 19 Management and to Sony BMG Publishing.

=== 2002–2004: False Smiles ===
In 2001, Studt was signed to Polydor Records and Universal Records at the age of 15, and delivered her debut album that same year. In July 2002, Studt released her first single, "Just a Little Girl", which entered the UK charts at No. 14.

In June 2003, Studt released her second single "Misfit", which made it to a chart position of No. 6 in the UK. Alongside the success of "Misfit" was the release of Studt's debut album False Smiles, which entered the chart at No. 24 and later climbed to its peak position of No. 18, going Gold in the UK and selling over 260,000 copies.

September 2003 saw the release of the third cut from the album, "Under the Thumb". This became her second Top 10 and third Top 20 single, entering at No. 10, which also helped push the album to a peak of No. 18. False Smiles was re-released at the beginning of 2004, adding one new track: a cover of the Sheryl Crow classic, "All I Wanna Do" on request of Crow herself who sang the backing vocals. The single peaked at No. 21 and subsequently, Studt was dropped from her record label Polydor.

=== 2007–2009: My Paper Made Men ===
In early 2006, after some time away from the public eye, Studt signed to the indie label 19 Entertainment. She also toured with Razorlight under the alias 'Jane Wails', saying: ' I was quite frightened of getting on stage and people having preconceived ideas of what I was about. I didn't want them saying, " Ooh, isn't she that girl from before, blah blah blah?'".

"Furniture", a single taken from the album My Paper Made Men, was released on 3 December 2007. Studt worked on the title song with Imogen Heap collaborator Guy Sigsworth, and her new songs received rave reviews. The LA Times wrote: 'Positively incandescent torch-singing Londoner with a hair-raising emotional range that varies from cut-glass fragility to cat-o'-nine-tails avenger' suggesting that listeners should "ignore any dim memories of her mid-teens pop phase [from] a while ago."

"Chasing the Light" was the next single, released on 28 April 2008. The album My Paper Made Men was released as a digital download on 5 May that year, and physically on 2 March 2009, along with the third single, "Nice Boys". It was then made public in April that Studt was dropped by her record label, and she chose to then leave her management shortly after.

=== 2009–present: third studio album ===
In 2017, Studt took part in a panel at AIM'S Indie-Con, discussing mental health within the music industry; she spoke openly about how in 2009, after moving back from New York City, she suffered a nervous breakdown at 22 years old and was diagnosed with rapid-cycling bipolar disorder. During a hospitalization that followed, she found that they had a piano, so she continued to write whilst inside.

In 2015, Studt announced that she had been working on a new album with Toby Kid from indie pop band Hatcham Social, and in 2017 she released a teaser single of two songs with Ditto Music as the first two released tunes from her soon to come third album: "I Was Jesus in Your Veins" and "Different Colour Pills". The eventual album, titled Happiest Girl in the Universe, was ultimately released in October 2019.

== Discography ==
=== Albums ===
List of albums, with selected details, chart positions and certifications
Title	Details	Peak chart positions	Certification
Title	Details	UK	Certification
False Smiles	Released: 30 June 2003; Label: Polydor; Formats: CD, digital download	18	BPI: Gold
My Paper Made Men	Released: 5 May 2008; Label: 19; Formats: CD, digital download	—	
Happiest Girl in the Universe	Released: 4 October 2019; Label: Crocodile Laboratories / Cargo; Formats: Vinyl, CD, digital download	—	
"—" denotes albums that were released but did not chart.

=== Singles ===
List of singles, with selected chart positions
Title	Year	Peak chart positions					Album
Title	Year	UK	AUS	IRE	NLD	SWE	Album
"Just a Little Girl"	2002	14	—	—	—	—	False Smiles
"Misfit"	2003	6	48	17	32	32	False Smiles
"Under the Thumb"	2003	10	—	36	—	—	False Smiles
"All I Wanna Do"	2004	21	—	25	—	—	False Smiles
"Furniture"	2007	—	—	—	—	—	My Paper Made Men
"Chasing the Light"	2008	—	—	—	—	—	My Paper Made Men
"Nice Boys"	2009	165	—	—	—	—	My Paper Made Men
"Different Coloured Pills"	2015	—	—	—	—	—	Happiest Girl in the Universe
"I Was Jesus in Your Veins"	2019	—	—	—	—	—	Happiest Girl in the Universe
"Let the Music Play"	2019	—	—	—	—	—	Happiest Girl in the Universe
"Sleepwalker"	2019	—	—	—	—	—	Happiest Girl in the Universe
"Overdose"	2019	—	—	—	—	—	Happiest Girl in the Universe
"The Water"	2019	—	—	—	—	—	Happiest Girl in the Universe
"—" denotes singles that were released but did not chart.
