= Just a Little Girl =

2002 single by Amy Studt

Single by Amy Studt

from the album False Smiles
- B-side: "Going out of My Mind"; "Kick Me"
- Released: 1 July 2002
- Length: 3:41
- Label: Polydor; 19
- Songwriter(s): Amy Studt; Yak Bondy
- Producer(s): Yak Bondy

Amy Studt singles chronology
"Just a Little Girl" (2002)	"Misfit" (2003)

"Just a Little Girl" is a song by English singer-songwriter Amy Studt. Released on 1 July 2002 as her debut single, it peaked at No. 14 on the UK Singles Chart. It appeared on her debut album, False Smiles, which was released a year later.

== Music video ==
The music video was directed by Sophie Muller. It shows Studt in an old house with crucifixes on the wall, playing a piano while silhouettes of people are dancing on the dancefloor. She then gets up and dances herself when the first chorus kicks in. Then Studt is shown at a beach with a man and she is playing with him. He then looks away and she pushes him over. Finally she appears to be in a glass coffin like that of Snow White, and she falls down into the arms of another Amy, who throws her away and dances until the end of the song.

== Track listings ==
UK CD single

1. "Just a Little Girl"
2. "Going out of My Mind"
3. "Kick Me"
4. "Just a Little Girl" (video)

UK cassette single

1. "Just a Little Girl"
2. "Going out of My Mind"

== Charts ==
Chart (2002)	Peak position
Europe (Eurochart Hot 100)	56
Scotland (OCC)	13
UK Singles (OCC)	14

== Release history ==
Region	Date	Format(s)	Label(s)	Ref.
United Kingdom	1 July 2002	CD; cassette	Polydor; 19	
United States	29 July 2002	Contemporary hit; alternative radio	19; Universal	
United States	3 September 2002	Adult contemporary radio	19; Universal	
