= Op zoek naar Mary Poppins =

- Starring: Frits Sissing (Host); Pia Douwes (Judge); Erwin van Lambaart (Judge); Thom Hoffman (Judge)
- Country of origin: Netherlands
- No. of series: 1
- No. of episodes: 9

Production
- Producer: Eyeworks

Original release
- Network: AVRO
- Release: 29 November 2009 – 24 January 2010

Related
- Op zoek naar Joseph; Op zoek naar Zorro

Op zoek naar Mary Poppins (Looking for Mary Poppins) is a 2009 talent show-themed television series produced by the AVRO in the Netherlands and broadcast on AVRO. It premiered in late August 2009. The show searched for a new, unknown lead to play Mary Poppins in a Dutch production of the Dutch musical Mary Poppins.

It was the third Dutch talent show to be produced by the AVRO/Willem Nijholt, after Op zoek naar Evita which aired in 2007 and Op zoek naar Joseph which aired in 2008. Op zoek naar Zorro aired in late 2010, Op zoek naar Annie aired in 2012, Op zoek naar Maria aired in 2021 and Op zoek naar Danny & Sandy aired in late 2022.

The show was hosted by Frits Sissing with Willem Nijholt again overseeing the programme.

In the final, on 24 January, Noortje Herlaar was announced as the winner of the series.

== Format ==
=== Expert panel ===
To assess and train the potential Marys and judge them during the live shows, an expert panel was chosen. The panel included:

- Willem Nijholt – actor and singer.
- Thom Hoffman – actor and photographer
- Erwin van Lambaart – managing director of Joop van den Ende theatre
- Pia Douwes – musical theatre actress who is very successful in Europe

=== Weekly format ===
The show opens with a group number by the Marys. Each Mary then performs a song, with feedback provided by the panel and Nijholt. The public votes for the contestant they wish to keep in the show. After the results of the public vote have been processed, the two Marys with the fewest votes enter a "sing-off". Nijholt then chooses which Mary from the "sing-off" to save each week. The eliminated Mary has her umbrella and coat stripped off by the surviving Mary and then takes the lead in their sing-out medley of "Een klein schepje suiker (A Spoonful of Sugar)" and "Alles kan (Anything Can Happen)".

== Finalists ==
Eleven potential Marys made it through the audition rounds and performed during the live shows.

Finalist	Age & Date of Birth *	Coat colour	Status
Eefje Thomassen	27 (6 June 1982)	Light pink	Eliminated 1st in week 1
Suzanne de Heij	28 (27 March 1981)	Lilac	Eliminated 2nd in week 1
Bente van den Brand	26 (8 November 1983)	Orange	Eliminated 3rd in week 2
Angenita van der Mee	22 (26 April 1987)	Dark pink	Eliminated 4th in week 3
Simone Breukink	22 (9 November 1987)	Lime green	Eliminated 5th in week 4
Carmen Danen	21 (9 April 1988)	Red	Eliminated 6th in week 5
Willemijn de Vries	24 (28 July 1985)	Blue	Eliminated 7th in week 6
Irene Borst	26 (7 November 1983)	Green	Eliminated 8th in week 7
Rosalie de Jong	24 (15 March 1985)	Purple	Third place
Sophie Veldhuizen	26 (6 March 1983)	Pale Blue	Second place
Noortje Herlaar	24 (22 April 1985)	Yellow	Winner

* at the start of the contest

=== Results summary ===
Results summary
Place	Contestant	Week 1		Week 2	Week 3	Week 4	Week 5	Week 6	Week 7	Final
Place	Contestant	Part 1	Part 2	Week 2	Week 3	Week 4	Week 5	Week 6	Week 7	Final
1	Noortje	Safe	Safe	Safe	Safe	Safe	Safe	Safe	Safe	Winner
2	Sophie	Safe	Safe	Safe	Safe	Safe	Safe	Safe	Safe	Second place
3	Rosalie	Safe	Safe	Safe	Safe	Safe	Safe	Safe	Bottom 2	Third place
4	Irene	Safe	Bottom 2	Safe	Bottom 2	Safe	Safe	Bottom 2	Eliminated	Eliminated
5	Willemijn	Safe	Safe	Safe	Safe	Bottom 2	Bottom 2	Eliminated	Eliminated	
6	Carmen	Bottom 2	Safe	Safe	Safe	Safe	Eliminated	Eliminated		
7	Simone	Safe	Safe	Safe	Safe	Eliminated	Eliminated			
8	Angenita	Safe	Safe	Bottom 2	Eliminated	Eliminated				
9	Bente	Safe	Safe	Eliminated	Eliminated					
10	Suzanne	Safe	Eliminated	Eliminated						
11	Eefje	Eliminated	Eliminated							

== Live shows ==
=== Week one (6 December) ===
Eefje was the first Mary to be eliminated in the Results show on Sunday followed by Suzanne who was the second Mary to be eliminated.

The show performances were:

- Group performances:
  - Opening number: "Hier ben ik dan (I Just Arrived)" with Freek Bartels from the musical Copacabana
  - Group number 1: "Supercalifragilisticexpialidocious"
  - Group number 2: "Zing, vecht, huil, bid, lach, werk en bewonder" & "We zullen doorgaan" as a tribute to the late Ramses Shaffy
- Individual performances (in order of performance):
  - Noortje & Carmen: "No More Tears (Enough Is Enough)" by Donna Summer & Barbra Streisand
  - Bente & Simone: "Ik ken hem te goed (I Know Him So Well)" from the musical Chess
  - Eefje, Sophie & Suzanne: "Ik ben een vrouw (I Am a Woman)" from the musical 3 Musketiers
  - Angenita & Willemijn: "Pak maar m‘n hand" by Nick & Simon
  - Irene & Rosalie: "Tell Him" by Céline Dion & Barbra Streisand
- Jury's favourite Mary Poppins:
  - Erwin van Lambaart: Sophie
  - Pia Douwes: Irene
  - Thom Hoffman: Noortje
- Sing-off:
  - In the first show, Eefje and Carmen were in the sing-off. They sang "Zonder jou" (by Simone Kleinsma & Paul de Leeuw).
  - Willem Nijholt chose to save Carmen and vote Eefje off.
  - In the second show, the bottom two were Irene and Suzanne. In the sing-off, they sang "Laat me niet alleen (Ne me quitte pas)" (by Jacques Brel).
  - Irene was saved by Nijholt and Suzanne was voted off.

=== Week two (13 December) ===
Bente was the third Mary to be eliminated in the Results show on Sunday

The show performances were:

- Group performances:
  - Opening number: "We're All in This Together" from the film High School Musical
  - Group number 1: "Supercalifragilisticexpialidocious"
  - Group number 2: "Starmaker" from the film Fame
- Individual performances (in order of performance):
  - Willemijn: "Ik voel me heerlijk (I Feel Pretty)" from the musical West Side Story
  - Carmen: "My All" by Mariah Carey
  - Sophie: "The Boy Does Nothing" by Alesha Dixon
  - Irene: "Denk aan mij (Think of Me)" from the musical The Phantom of the Opera
  - Rosalie: "Nu dat jij er bent" by Trijntje Oosterhuis
  - Angenita: "Dingen waar ik zo van hou (My Favorite Things)" from the musical The Sound of Music
  - Simone: "Geef me liefde (Love Me Tender)" from the musical All Shook Up
  - Bente: "Hot n Cold" by Katy Perry
  - Noortje: "Tot jij mijn liefde voelt (To Make You Feel My Love)" by Van Dik Hout
- Jury's favourite Mary Poppins:
  - Erwin van Lambaart: Simone
  - Pia Douwes: Simone
  - Thom Hoffman: Noortje
- Sing-off:
  - Bente and Angenita were in the sing-off. They sang "Er is een plaats voor ons (Somewhere)" (from the musical West Side Story).
  - Willem Nijholt chose to save Angenita and vote Bente off.

=== Week three (20 December) ===
Angenita was the fourth Mary to be eliminated in the Results show on Sunday.

The show performances were:

- Group performances:
  - Opening number: "Sleigh Ride" by The Ronettes
  - Group number 1: "Supercalifragilisticexpialidocious"
  - Group number 2: "I Will Follow Him" from the film Sister Act
- Individual performances (in order of performance):
  - Irene: "Why Couldn't It Be Christmas Every Day?" by Bianca Ryan
  - Sophie: "Wat is mijn hart" by Marco Borsato
  - Angenita: "Santa Claus is Coming to Town" by Mariah Carey
  - Noortje: "Kom Terug En Dans Met Mij (I Could Have Danced All Night)" from the musical My Fair Lady
  - Willemijn: "Winter Wonderland" by Amy Grant
  - Rosalie: "Cheek to Cheek" by Jane Monheit
  - Carmen: "Dat zegt het hart (A Change in Me)" from the musical Beauty and the Beast
  - Simone: "All I Want for Christmas Is You" by Mariah Carey
- Jury's favourite Mary Poppins:
  - Erwin van Lambaart: Simone
  - Pia Douwes: Rosalie
  - Thom Hoffman: Sophie
- Sing-off:
  - Irene and Angenita were in the sing-off. They sang "Nog een kans" (by Vera Mann).
  - Willem Nijholt chose to save Irene and vote Angenita off.

=== Week four (27 December) ===
Simone was the fifth Mary to be eliminated in the Results show on Sunday

The show performances were:

- Group performances:
  - Opening number: "Come Fly with Me" by Frank Sinatra
  - Group number 1: "Supercalifragilisticexpialidocious"
  - Group number 2: "Love Me Just a Little Bit More" by Dolly Dots
- Individual performances (in order of performance):
  - Simone: "Ik leef niet meer voor jou" by Marco Borsato
  - Irene: "I Still Haven't Found What I'm Looking For" by U2
  - Noortje: "I'm the Greatest Star" from the musical Funny Girl
  - Rosalie: "Appels op de tafelsprei" by Toon Hermans & Mathilde Santing
  - Willemijn: "Hij kan niet zonder mij (As Long as He Needs Me)" from the musical Oliver!
  - Sophie: "Fields of Gold" by Eva Cassidy
  - Carmen: "Diamonds Are a Girl's Best Friend" from the film Moulin Rouge
- Jury's favourite Mary Poppins:
  - Erwin van Lambaart: Rosalie
  - Pia Douwes: Noortje
  - Thom Hoffman: Irene
- Sing-off:
  - Willemijn and Simone were in the sing-off. They sang "Telkens weer" (by Willeke Alberti).
  - Willem Nijholt chose to save Willemijn and vote Simone off.

=== Week five (3 January) ===
Carmen was the sixth Mary to be eliminated in the Results show on Sunday.

The show performances were:

- Group performances:
  - Opening number: "Crazy in Love" by Beyoncé Knowles
  - Group number 1: "A Spoonful of Sugar" featuring the children, who will play as Jane and Michael Banks in the upcoming Dutch production of Mary Poppins
  - Group number 2: "Supercalifragilisticexpialidocious"
  - Group number 3: "December, 1963 (Oh, What a Night)" from the musical Jersey Boys
- Individual performances (in order of performance):
  - Sophie: "Als ze mij zo zouwen zien" ("If My Friends Could See Me Now") from the musical Sweet Charity
  - Noortje: "Almaz" (Dutch version) by Karin Bloemen
  - Rosalie: "Het gaat beginnen" ("Something's Coming") from the musical West Side Story
  - Willemijn: "Don't Rain on My Parade" from the musical Funny Girl
  - Carmen: "Wacht nog wat" by Paul de Leeuw
  - Irene: "Meidengrut" ("Little Girls") from the musical Annie
- Jury's favourite Mary Poppins:
  - Erwin van Lambaart: Noortje
  - Pia Douwes: Irene (but revealed that her other favourite was Noortje, but was positive about Irene)
  - Thom Hoffman: Sophie
- Sing-off:
  - Carmen and Willemijn were in the sing-off. They sang "Laat het op een zondag zijn (Tell Me on a Sunday)" (from the musical of the same name).
  - Willem Nijholt chose to save Willemijn and vote Carmen off.

=== Week six (10 January) ===
Week six was the quarter-final stage of the series.

Willemijn was the seventh Mary to be eliminated in the Results show on Sunday.

The show performances were:

- Group performances:
  - Opening number: "Fame" from the film Fame
  - Group number 1: "Supercalifragilisticexpialidocious"
  - Group number 2: "I Say A Little Prayer" by Aretha Franklin
- Individual performances (in order of performance):
- Round 1:
  - Willemijn: "Lief zijn voor mamma (When You're Good to Mama)" from the musical Chicago
  - Rosalie: "Zeur niet" from the musical Heerlijk duurt het langst
  - Irene: "Vincent (Dutch version)" by Don McLean
  - Sophie: "De nachten in Parijs" from the musical Irma la Douce
  - Noortje: "Zin in een feessie" from the musical De Stunt
- Round 2:
  - Willemijn: "I Will Survive" from the musical Priscilla Queen of the Desert – the Musical
  - Rosalie: "Mijn pakkie an (My Strongest Suit)" from the musical Aida
  - Irene: "Hopeloos verlang ik naar jou (Hopelessy Devoted to You)" from the musical Grease
  - Sophie: "Get Happy" by Judy Garland
  - Noortje: "Smile" by Charlie Chaplin
- Jury's favourite Mary Poppins:
  - Erwin van Lambaart: Noortje
  - Pia Douwes: Rosalie
  - Thom Hoffman: Noortje
- Sing-off:
  - Willemijn and Irene were in the sing-off. They sang "Vluchten kan niet meer" (from the musical En nu naar bed).
  - Willem Nijholt chose to save Irene and vote Willemijn off.

=== Week seven (17 January) ===
Week seven was the semi-final stage of the series.

Irene was the eighth Mary to be eliminated in the Results show on Sunday – the last time Nijholt has any say in the vote.

The show performances were:

- Group performances:
  - Opening number: "Could It Be Magic" by Barry Manilow
  - Group number 1: "Supercalifragilisticexpialidocious"
  - Group number 2: "Chim Chim Cher-ee (Rooftop Duet)" featuring William Spaaij, who will play as Bert in the upcoming Dutch production of Mary Poppins
- Individual performances (in order of performance):
- Round 1:
  - Irene: "Heel alleen (On My Own)" from the musical Les Misérables
  - Noortje: "I Have Nothing" by Whitney Houston
  - Sophie: "Out Here on My Own" from the film Fame
  - Rosalie: "Doe iets (Show Me)" from the musical My Fair Lady
- Round 2:
  - Irene: "Stuff Like That There" from the film For the Boys
  - Noortje: "Jaloezie" by Adèle Bloemendaal
  - Sophie: "Mens durf te leven" by Wende Snijders
  - Rosalie: "A Song for You" by Donny Hathaway
- Jury's favourite Mary Poppins:
  - Erwin van Lambaart: Noortje
  - Pia Douwes: Sophie
  - Thom Hoffman: Irene
- Sing-off:
  - Irene and Rosalie were in the sing-off. They sang "Misschien dit keer (Maybe This Time)" (from the musical Cabaret).
  - Willem Nijholt chose to save Rosalie and vote Irene off.

=== Week-eight (24 January) ===
Week eight was the final week of the show and the Grand-final when the winning Mary was revealed. Both shows aired live on Sunday with the main show and the Results show. The finalists were Noortje Herlaar, Rosalie de Jong and Sophie Veldhuizen. Noortje was the winner.

With all the decisions now being from the public vote, the voting lines opened at the start of Show One. At the end of Show One, the finalist with the lowest number of viewers votes, Rosalie was eliminated and therefore finished third. The voting lines then re-opened to vote for the series winner, with all the votes cast for the remaining two Marys carried over. Then in Show Two the final two Marys went head-to-head before the winner was announced as Noortje.

All eleven Mary finalists also performed. In Show two both Noortje and Sophie performed "Alles kan als jij het (Anything Can Happen)".

The show performances were:

- Group performances:
  - Former Marys – "De winnaar krijgt de macht (The Winner Takes It All)" from the musical Mamma Mia!
  - Noortje, Rosalie & Sophie – "Als ik win (Brand New Day)" from the musical The Wiz
  - Noortje, Rosalie & Sophie – "Sing, Sing, Sing" by Louis Prima
  - Noortje & Sophie – "Tamelijk Voortreffelijk (Practically Perfect)"
- Individual performances (in order of performance):
  - Show one
    - Rosalie: "Thuis (Home)" from the musical The Wiz
    - Sophie: "Kon ik nog maar even bij je zijn (Wishing You Were Somehow Here Again)" from the musical The Phantom of the Opera
    - Noortje: "Pap, kun je me horen? (Papa, Can You Hear Me?)" from the film Yentl
  - Show two
    - Sophie: "Alles kan (Anything Can Happen)"
    - Noortje: "Alles kan (Anything Can Happen)"
- Show One third place
  - At the end of Show one, Rosalie was announced as finishing third.
- Jury's verdict on who is Mary Poppins:
  - After Rosalie was eliminated from the final, the jury share their thoughts on who is Mary Poppins.
    - Erwin van Lambaart: Noortje
    - Pia Douwes: could not make a choice between Noortje and Sophie
    - Thom Hoffman: Sophie
    - Willem Nijholt: Noortje
- The Final Vote

The final vote was then announced and it was revealed that the winner was Noortje Herlaar.
