= Op zoek naar Zorro =

Dutch television talent series

- Starring: Frits Sissing (Host); Pia Douwes (Judge); Erwin van Lambaart (Judge); Johan Nijenhuis (Judge (auditions only))
- Country of origin: Netherlands
- No. of series: 1

Production
- Producer: Eyeworks

Original release
- Network: AVRO
- Release: 31 December 2010 – 19 February 2011

Related
- Op zoek naar Mary Poppins; Op zoek naar Annie

Op zoek naar Zorro (Looking for Zorro) is a Dutch television talent series broadcast on AVRO from late 2010 until early 2011. It documented the search for a new, undiscovered musical theatre performer to play the role of Zorro in the then-forthcoming stage production of Zorro, the musical with book written by Stephen Clark and Helen Edmundson and music by the Gipsy Kings and John Cameron. Produced by Eyeworks for the AVRO, the series was hosted by Frits Sissing and judged by Willem Nijholt.

The series follows previous collaborations between the AVRO, Willem Nijholt and others to find new musical theatre performers: Op zoek naar Evita which was won by Brigitte Heitzer, Op zoek naar Joseph which was won by Freek Bartels and Op zoek naar Mary Poppins which was won by Noortje Herlaar. 10 years later, it was followed by Op zoek naar Maria which was won by Nandi Van Beurden and Op zoek naar Danny & Sandy which was won by Tristan van der Lingen and Danique Graanoogst.

== Auditions ==
Applications for the series from those from 20 to 35 were solicited in March 2010 all over the Netherlands.

== Expert panel ==
An expert panel provided advice to the contestants throughout the series, and provided comments during the live shows. The panel was made up of:

- Pia Douwes, (musical theatre actress who is very successful in Europe)
- Erwin van Lambaarts (managing director of Joop van den Ende theatre)
- Willem Nijholt (head judge and actor and singer.)

== Finalists ==
Eleven potential Zorros made it through the audition rounds and will perform during the live shows starting from 1 January 2011 but this time, the live shows will be shifted from Sunday to Saturday nights. The final will be broadcast on 19 February 2011. Each potential Zorro wore a black jacket and a sash of a certain colour, which made identification easier. At the end of every live show, the losing Zorro would have his jacket and sash stripped by the Zorro who survived the sing off, then takes the lead song of the farewell song: Masker (Slotlied)

The eventual winner, Tommie Christiaan, had previously initially made it to the finals in Op zoek naar Joseph in 2008, but had dropped out when he had been offered a lead role in High School Musical. Fourth-placed Dennis de Groot was offered a part in the ensemble in Zorro when he was eliminated, which he accepted.

Finalist	Age & Date of Birth *	Sash colour	Status
Sandor Sturbl	25 (9 August 1985)	Lilac	Eliminated 1st in week 1
Samuel Hubner Casado	25 (9 March 1985)	Burgundy	Eliminated 2nd in week 2
Dennis ten Vergert	30 (9 April 1980)	Red	Eliminated 3rd in week 3
Jeroen Dekkers	21 (26 January 1989)	Yellow	Eliminated 4th in week 4
Kelvin Wormgoor	26 (12 May 1984)	Light blue	Eliminated 5th in week 4
Marijn Brouwers	35 (15 August 1975)	Maroon	Eliminated 6th in week 5
Mischa Kiek	22 (21 October 1988)	Orange	Eliminated 7th in week 6
Dennis de Groot	28 (1 July 1982)	Dark green	Eliminated 8th in week 7
Ruud van Overdijk	23 (11 June 1987)	Dark blue	Third Place
Roman van der Werff	26 (7 May 1984)	Forest green	Second Place
Tommie Christiaan	24 (24 February 1986)	Purple	Winner

* at the start of the series

Results summary
Place	Contestant	Show 1	Show 2	Show 3	Show 4		Show 5	Show 6	Show 7	Show 8	
Place	Contestant	Show 1	Show 2	Show 3	Part 1	Part 2	Show 5	Show 6	Show 7	Part 1	Part 2
1	Tommie										Winner
2	Roman							Bottom 2			Second place
3	Ruud								Bottom 2	Bottom	Third place
4	Dennis de G.								Bottom 2	Eliminated 8th	
5	Mischa				Bottom 2		Bottom 2	Bottom 2	Eliminated 7th		
6	Marijn			Bottom 2		Bottom 2	Bottom 2	Eliminated 6th			
7	Kelvin		Bottom 2			Bottom 2	Eliminated 5th				
8	Jeroen				Bottom 2	Eliminated 4th					
9	Dennis ten V.			Bottom 2	Eliminated 3rd						
10	Samuel	Bottom 2	Bottom 2	Eliminated 2nd							
11	Sandor	Bottom 2	Eliminated 1st								

== Jury's favourite Zorro ==
Liveshows	Erwin van Lambaart	Pia Douwes	Guest judges
Liveshow 1	Dennis ten Vergert	Ruud van Overdijk	Samuel Hubner Casado
Liveshow 2	Ruud van Overdijk	Tommie Christiaan	Ruud van Overdijk
Liveshow 3	Roman van der Werff	Jeroen Dekkers	Roman van der Werff
Liveshow 4	Tommie Christiaan	Roman van der Werff	Ruud van Overdijk
Liveshow 5	Roman van der Werff	Tommie Christiaan	Tommie Christiaan
Liveshow 6	Ruud van Overdijk	Dennis de Groot	Tommie Christiaan
Liveshow 7	Ruud van Overdijk	Tommie Christiaan	Tommie Christiaan
Liveshow 81	Tommie Christiaan	2	3

1 Willem's choice for Zorro was Roman van der Werff

2 Pia could not make a choice

3 Monique van de Ven could not make a choice

== Live shows ==
=== Week 1 (1 January) ===
The first of the live finals on New Year's Day on Saturday 1 January 2011 saw the 11 finalists perform to stay in the competition. It also saw the winner of Op zoek naar Evita Brigitte Heitzer as the first guest judge. The results show saw Sandor become the first contestant to be eliminated. The performances during the first week were:

- Group performances:
  - Opening mash-up: "I Gotta Feeling" (by Black Eyed Peas)/"Huil niet om mij Argentina (Don't Cry for Me Argentina)" (from the musical Evita)/"Sluit alle deuren (Close Every Door)" (from the musical Joseph and the Amazing Technicolour Dreamcoat)/"Alles kan (Anything Can Happen)" (from the musical Mary Poppins) with Brigitte Heitzer, Freek Bartels and Noortje Herlaar
  - Group mash-up: "Beggin'" (by Madcon)/"You Keep Me Hangin' On" (by The Supremes)
- Individual performances (in order of performance):
  - Tommie: "Tegen alle verwachtingen in" (from the musical Nine)
  - Kelvin: "Sway" (by Michael Bublé)
  - Samuel: "Zeg me dat het niet zo is" (by Frank Boeijen)
  - Roman: "I Got Life" (from the musical Hair)
  - Marijn: "Ik vroeg te veel" (from the musical Joe de Musical)
  - Jeroen: "Billionaire" (by Travie McCoy feat. Bruno Mars)
  - Sandor: "Tot het einde (Go the Distance)" (from the film Hercules)
  - Ruud: "Whataya Want from Me" (by Adam Lambert)
  - Mischa: "Mensenkind (Son of Man)" (from the musical Tarzan)
  - Dennis de G.: "Have You Ever Really Loved a Woman" (by Bryan Adams)
  - Dennis ten V.: "Het is Over" (by Jeroen van der Boom)
- Sing-off:
  - Sandor was joined in the sing-off by Samuel. They performed "Niets dan dit" by BLØF and Trijntje Oosterhuis.
  - Willem Nijholt chose to save Samuel and eliminate Sandor.

=== Week 2 (8 January) ===
The second live show on Saturday 8 January 2011 saw the 10 finalists perform to stay in the competition. The guest judge this week was singer and actress Karin Bloemen. The results show saw Samuel become the second contestant to be eliminated. The performances during the second week were:

- Group performances:
  - Opening mash-up: "Relight My Fire" (by Take That)/"We Didn't Start the Fire" (by Billy Joel) with Karin Bloemen
  - Group number: "Teenage Dream" (by Katy Perry)
- Individual performances (in order of performance):
  - Jeroen: "Just the Way You Are" (by Billy Joel)
  - Dennis de G.: "De laatste dans (The Last Dance)" (from the musical Elisabeth)
  - Roman: "Every Little Thing She Does Is Magic" (by The Police)
  - Marijn: "Engel van Kristal (Crystal Angel)" (from the musical 3 Musketiers)
  - Dennis ten V.: "Livin' la Vida Loca" (by Ricky Martin)
  - Mischa: "Wat voorbij is" (by Karin Bloemen)
  - Samuel: "Somewhere Only We Know" (by Keane)
  - Ruud: "Zij" (by Marco Borsato)
  - Kelvin: "Als ik bij je ben (Not While I'm Around)" (from the musical Sweeney Todd: The Demon Barber of Fleet Street)
  - Tommie: "Make 'Em Laugh" (from the musical Singin' in the Rain)
- Sing-off:
  - Samuel was joined in the sing-off by Kelvin. They performed "De laatste dag" by 3JS.
  - Willem Nijholt chose to save Kelvin and eliminate Samuel.

=== Week 3 (15 January) ===
The third live show on Saturday 15 January 2011 saw the 9 finalists perform to stay in the competition. The guest judge this week was singer and musical actress Kim-Lian van der Meij. The results show saw Dennis ten V. become the third contestant to be eliminated. The performances during the third week were:

- Group performances:
  - Opening mash-up: "I Kissed a Girl" (by Katy Perry)/"Only Girl (In the World)" (by Rihanna) with Kim-Lian van der Meij
  - Group number: "Mercy" (by Duffy)
- Individual performances (in order of performance):
  - Marijn: "Ordinary People" (by John Legend)
  - Tommie: "Cool" (from the musical West Side Story)
  - Dennis de G.: "You Don't Know" (by Milow)
  - Mischa: "Waarom ben ik hier" (from the musical Joe de Musical)
  - Dennis ten V.: "I'm Alive" (from the musical Next to Normal)
  - Roman: "Alsof je bij me bent" (by Nurlaila Karim)
  - Kelvin: "Mack the Knife" (from the musical The Threepenny Opera)
  - Jeroen: "Want je vernielt me (Your Love Will Kill Me)" (from the musical Notre Dame de Paris)
  - Ruud: "Kiss from a Rose" (by Seal)
- Sing-off:
  - Dennis ten V. was joined in the sing-off by Marijn. They performed "Zeg me dat het niet waar is (Tell Me It's Not True)" from the musical Blood Brothers.
  - Willem Nijholt chose to save Marijn and eliminate Dennis ten V.

=== Week 4 (22 January) ===
The fourth live show on Saturday 22 January 2011 saw the 8 finalists perform to stay in the competition. The guest judge this week was singer and musical actress Antje Monteiro. The results show saw Jeroen and Kelvin become the fourth and fifth contestants to be eliminated. The performances during the fourth week were:

- Group performances:
  - Opening mash-up: "Livin' on a Prayer" (by Bon Jovi)/"Like a Prayer" (by Madonna) with Antje Monteiro
  - Group number: "Kiss" (by Prince & The Revolution)
- Individual performances (in order of performance):
  - Jeroen & Mischa: "Me and My Shadow" (by Michael Ball & Antonio Banderas)
  - Marijn & Kelvin: "Lang is de nacht (Endless Night)" (from the musical The Lion King)
  - Dennis de G. & Ruud: "Hair" (from the musical Hair)
  - Tommie & Roman: "Mijn Houten Hart (My Wooden Heart)" (by Paul de Leeuw)
- Sing-off 1:
  - Jeroen was joined in the sing-off by Mischa. They performed "Afscheid nemen bestaat niet" by Marco Borsato.
  - Willem Nijholt chose to save Mischa and eliminate Jeroen
- Sing-off 2:
  - Kelvin was joined in the sing-off by Marijn. They performed "Sluit alle deuren (Close Every Door)" from the musical Joseph and the Amazing Technicolor Dreamcoat.
  - Marijn was saved by Nijholt and Kelvin was eliminated

=== Week 5 (29 January) ===
The fifth live show on Saturday 29 January 2011 saw the 6 finalists perform to stay in the competition. The guest judge this week was actress, singer and musician Ellen ten Damme. The results show saw Marijn become the sixth contestant to be eliminated. The performances during the fifth week were:

- Group performances:
  - Opening number: "The Time Warp" (from the musical The Rocky Horror Show) with Ellen ten Damme
  - Roman, Mischa and Tommie: "María" (by Ricky Martin)
  - Dennis de G., Ruud and Marijn: "Total Eclipse of the Heart" (by Bonnie Tyler)
  - Group mash-up: "Dancing in the Street" (by Martha and the Vandellas)/"You Should Be Dancing" (by Bee Gees)/"Dancing on the Ceiling" (by Lionel Richie)
- Individual performances (in order of performance):
  - Roman: "Feeling Good" (by Michael Bublé)
  - Mischa: "Het is alsof de wereld vergaat (Losing My Mind)" (from the musical Follies)
  - Dennis de G.: "One Night Only" (from the musical Dreamgirls)
  - Tommie: "Als mijn hoofd mijn hart vertrouwt" (by Marco Borsato)
  - Ruud: "Wat is haar mysterie (What Is It About Her)" (from the musical The Wild Party)
  - Marijn: "Don't Stop Me Now" (by Queen)
- Sing-off:
  - Marijn was joined in the sing-off by Mischa. They performed "Vleugels van mijn lucht" by Paul de Leeuw.
  - Willem Nijholt chose to save Mischa and eliminate Marijn.

=== Week 6 (5 February) ===
The sixth live show on Saturday 5 February 2011 saw the 5 finalists perform to stay in the competition. The guest judge this week was actress and musical star Chantal Janzen. The results show saw Mischa become the seventh contestant to be eliminated. The performances during the sixth week were:

- Group performances:
  - Opening mash-up: "Love Don't Let Me Go (Walking Away)" (by David Guetta)/"Can't Get You Out of My Head" (by Kylie Minogue)/"Lovefool" (by The Cardigans) with Chantal Janzen
  - Group number: "I Was Made for Lovin' You" (by Kiss)
- Individual performances (in order of performance):
- Round 1:
  - Dennis de G.: "Footloose" (from the musical Footloose)
  - Ruud: "Zonder jou (Without You)" (by Mariah Carey)
  - Mischa: "Ladies' Choice" (by Zac Efron)
  - Tommie: "I Don't Want to Miss a Thing" (by Aerosmith)
  - Roman: "In de straat waar jij woont (On the Street Where You Live)" (from the musical My Fair Lady)
- Round 2:
  - Dennis de G.: "Voor haar" (by Frans Halsema)
  - Ruud: "Pinball Wizard" (by The Who)
  - Mischa: "Liefde van later (La chanson des vieux amants)" (by Jacques Brel)
  - Tommie: "Kom terug en dans met mij (I Could Have Danced All Night)" (from the musical My Fair Lady)
  - Roman: "On the Wings of Love" by Jeffrey Osborne
- Sing-off:
  - Mischa was joined in the sing-off by Roman. They performed "De winnaar krijgt de macht (The Winner Takes It All)" from the musical Mamma Mia.
  - Willem Nijholt chose to save Roman and eliminate Mischa.

=== Week 7 (12 February) ===
The seventh week of competition was the semi-final stage of the series. On 12 February 2011 the four remaining contestants sang live for a place in the final. This week's guest judge was singer Berget Lewis. The results show saw Dennis de G. became the eighth contestant to be eliminated from the competition. The performances during the seventh week were:

- Group performances:
  - Opening mash-up: "When Love Takes Over" (by David Guetta featuring Kelly Rowland)/"DJ Got Us Fallin' in Love" (by Usher) with Berget Lewis
  - Group mash-up: "The Final Countdown" (by Europe)/"Another One Bites the Dust" (by Queen)
- Individual performances (in order of performance):
- Round 1 (Solo numbers):
  - Roman: "Dat ik besta (Being Alive)" (from the musical Company)
  - Tommie: "Night Fever" (from the musical Saturday Night Fever)
  - Dennis de G.: "De Melodieën van de nacht (The Music of the Night)" (from the musical The Phantom of the Opera)
  - Ruud: "River Deep – Mountain High" (by Tina Turner)
- Round 2 (Duet numbers):
  - Roman: "You're the One That I Want" (from the musical Grease) with Rosalie de Jong
  - Tommie: "Wereld zonder jou" (by Marco Borsato & Trijntje Oosterhuis) with Nurlaila Karim
  - Dennis de G.: mash-up of "Open Your Heart/Borderline" (by Madonna) with Bettina Holwerda
  - Ruud: "Ergens in de sterren (Written in the Stars)" (from the musical Aida) with Pearl Jozefzoon
- Sing-off:
  - Dennis de G. was joined in the sing-off by Ruud. They performed "Bloed, zweet en tranen" by André Hazes.
  - Willem Nijholt chose to save Ruud and eliminate Dennis de G., but Erwin van Lambaart offered Dennis de G. a job as a key member of the ensemble in the musical Zorro which he accepted.

=== Week 8 (19 February) ===
==== Grand Final Show 1 ====
- Group performances:
  - Finalists and former contestants: "’’Zorro’’ mash-up of Bamboleo/Djobi, Djoba" with ensemble from Zorro
  - Finalists: mash-up of "The Lady Is a Tramp" (by Frank Sinatra)/"Bad Boy" (by Miami Sound Machine) with Pia Douwes
- Individual performances (in order of performance):
  - Ruud: "Wat is mijn hart" (by Marco Borsato)
  - Roman: "Jij moet verder" (by René Froger)
  - Tommie: "Omarm" (by BLØF)
- Third Place:
  - Having received the lowest number of votes from the viewers, Ruud finished in third place.

==== Grand Final Show 2 ====
- Final performances
  - Following the elimination of Ruud, the final two both performed "Een liefde die niet mag bestaan" ("A Love We'll Never Live"), from the musical Zorro, with Michelle Splietelhof, who will play Luisa in Zorro, and each performed "Hoop" ("Hope"), a second song from that musical:
    - Roman: "Hoop" ("Hope")
    - Tommie: "Hoop" ("Hope")
- The Final Vote
  - The final vote was then announced and it was revealed that the winner was Tommie Christiaan. He then concluded the series with a performance of "Masker (Slotlied)" and "Baila Me".

== Guest judges ==
- Week 1: Brigitte Heitzer
- Week 2: Karin Bloemen
- Week 3: Kim-Lian van der Meij
- Week 4: Antje Monteiro
- Week 5: Ellen ten Damme
- Week 6: Chantal Janzen
- Week 7: Berget Lewis
- Week 8: Monique van de Ven
