= Frits Sissing =

Dutch television presenter (born 1963)

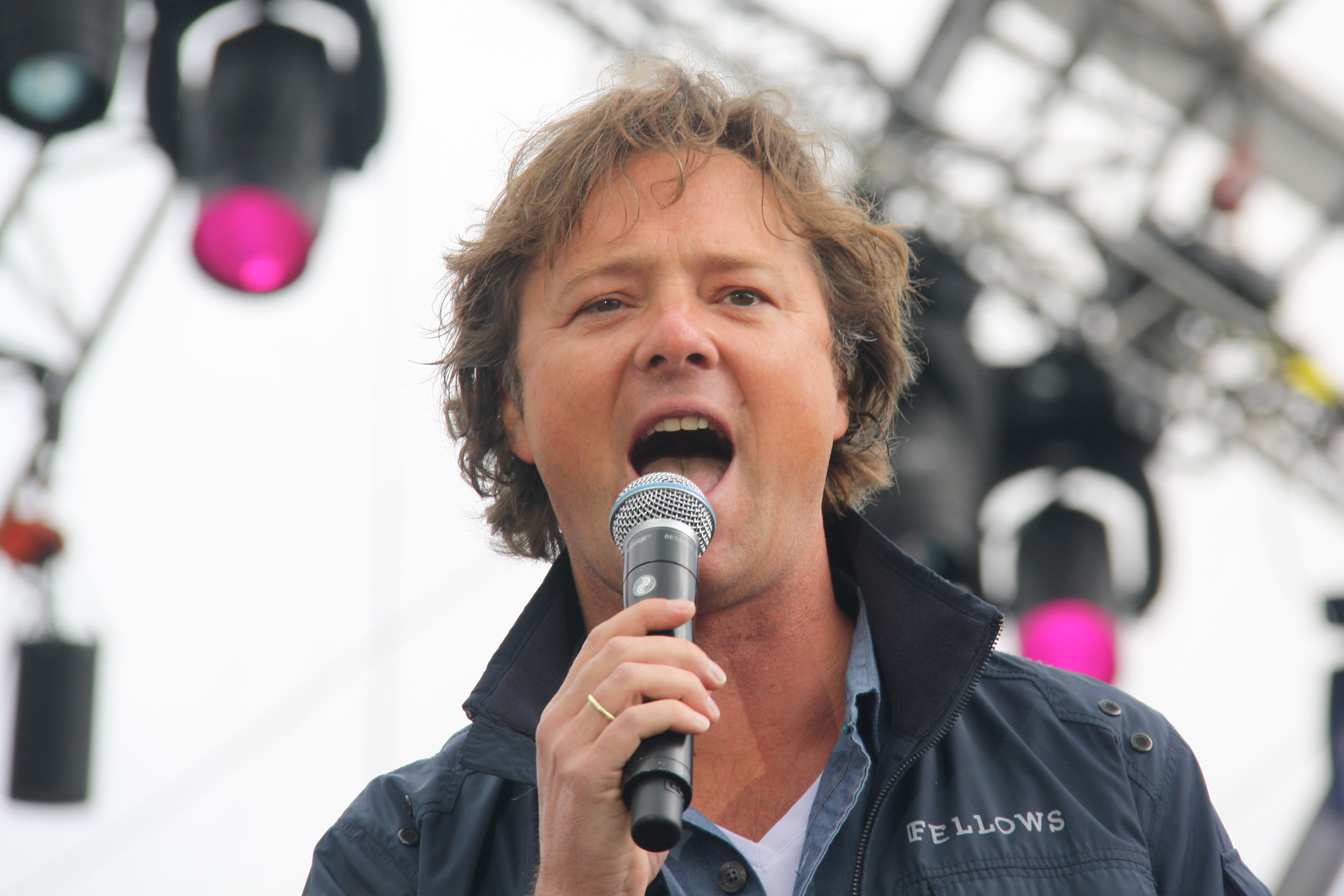
- Sissing in 2011
- Born: 18 September 1963 (age 62); Groningen, Netherlands
- Occupation: Television presenter

Frits Sissing (born 18 September 1963) is a Dutch television presenter. He is known for presenting television shows which include Opsporing Verzocht, Tussen Kunst & Kitsch and Maestro. He also presented Blik op de weg and several talent show-themed television series to find a musical theatre performer for a musical.

== Career ==
Sissing presented the television show Opsporing Verzocht from 1999 to 2007 and from 2011 to 2014. He won the tenth season (2010) of the television series Wie is de Mol?. He won by correctly identifying Kim Pieters as the Mole. Since 2012, he presents the television show Maestro in which contestants compete to become the best conductor. At the time, he was hoping to become the presenter of Strictly Come Dancing instead of Maestro but that show was given by AVROTROS to Reinout Oerlemans. He also presented a two-part special titled Het Mooiste van Maestro in which contestants look back on their participation in the show.

He presented the television show Blik op de weg, a show about road transport, traffic violations and other situations that occur on the road. He presents the television show Tussen Kunst & Kitsch since September 2015. In the show, guests bring objects to an antique expert who describes the object, provides historic context where possible and also estimates the value of the object.

Sissing plays a role in the 2017 film Pestkop directed by Sjoerd de Bont. In 2021, he appeared in the photography game show Het Perfecte Plaatje in which contestants compete to create the best photo in various challenges. He finished in second place.

Sissing presented the 20th edition of the Musical Awards in April 2022. He also presented many other editions of the Musical Awards.

== Selected filmography ==
=== As presenter ===
- Opsporing Verzocht (1999 – 2007, 2011 – 2014)
- Op zoek naar Evita (2007)
- Op zoek naar Mary Poppins (2009, 2010)
- Op zoek naar Zorro (2010, 2011)
- Maestro (2012 – present)
- Blik op de weg (2012 – 2015)
- Tussen Kunst & Kitsch (2015 – present)
- Op zoek naar Maria (2021)
- Op zoek naar Danny & Sandy (2022, 2023)
- Het Mooiste van Maestro (2023)

=== As contestant ===
- Dancing with the Stars (2006)
- Ik hou van Holland (2008, 2012)
- Wie is de Mol? (2010)
- De Jongens tegen de Meisjes (2014)
- Het Perfecte Plaatje (2021)

=== As actor ===
- Pestkop (2017)
