= Op zoek naar Maria =

Belgian talent competition TV show

- Starring: Flemish: Koen Wauters (host); Frank Van Laecke (judge); Linda Lepomme (judge); Peter de Smet (judge); Dutch: Frits Sissing (host); Pia Douwes (judge); Jamai Loman (judge); Carline Brouwer (judge); Richard Groenendijk (judge)
- Countries of origin: Belgium, Netherlands
- No. of seasons: 1
- No. of episodes: 10-11

Production
- Producer: Eyeworks

Original release
- Network: VTM
- Release: 25 March – 3 June 2009
- Network: AVROTROS
- Release: 21 February – 4 April 2021

Related
- Op zoek naar Annie; Op zoek naar Danny & Sandy

Op zoek naar Maria (Looking for Maria) is a talent competition program that aired in Belgium on VTM. It premiered on 25 March 2009. The premise of the series was to find a musical theatre performer to play the role of Maria von Trapp in the 2009 Albert Verlinde and Roel Vente revival of The Sound of Music at the Efteling Theatre. The show is hosted by Koen Wauters and featured Frank Van Laecke, Linda Lepomme, and Peter de Smet as the judges for the show.

Following a public telephone vote, 27-year-old Deborah De Ridder was chosen as Maria with 25-year-old Fleur Brusselmans as the runner up and Liv Van Aelst in third place.

A commercial advertising the show, featuring over 200 dancers in it, seemingly spontaneously, to "Do-Re-Mi" in Antwerpen-Centraal railway station, has received over 20,000,000 hits on YouTube.

A similar format of Op zoek naar Maria has been used as well in The Netherlands in 2021 taking an unknown singer and placing the winner in the lead role of Maria for the 2021 performances in The Netherlands. The show is hosted by Frits Sissing and featured Pia Douwes, Jamai Loman, Carline Brouwer and Richard Groenendijk as the judges for the show. It was the fifth Dutch talent show to be produced by AVRO, 10 years after Op zoek naar Evita, Op zoek naar Joseph, Op zoek naar Mary Poppins, Op zoek naar Zorro and Op zoek naar Annie. In the final, on 4 April, Nandi Van Beurden was announced as the winner of the series. This was followed by Op zoek naar Danny & Sandy in late 2022, which was won by Tristan van der Lingen and Danique Graanoogst.

A similar format has been used as well in the United Kingdom in 2006, with the show How Do You Solve a Problem like Maria? taking an unknown singer and placing the winner in the lead role for the 2006 performances in the West End. On 16 September 2006, Connie Fisher was announced the winner of this show.

== Belgium ==
=== Finalists ===
Eleven contestants made it through the audition rounds and performed during the live shows.

Finalist	Age*	From	Dress Colour	Status
Dorien Ackx	25	Geel	Pink	Eliminated 1st in week 1
Helen Geets	33	Merksem	Green	Eliminated 2nd in week 2
Ellen Vandervieren	28	Beveren	Yellow	Eliminated 3rd in week 3
Sandra Paelinck	23	Mortsel	Dark Blue	Eliminated 4th in week 4
Marian Van Klaveren	31	Lede	Purple	Quit in week 5
Elisabeth Herman	26	Wetteren	Red	Eliminated 5th in week 6
Elke Buyle	23	Duffel	Light yellow	Eliminated 6th in week 7
Katrien Smets	22	Tienen	Light Blue	Eliminated 7th in week 8
Liv Van Aelst	34	Brasschaat	Orange	Third place
Fleur Brusselmans	25	Ghent	Lavender	Second place
Deborah De Ridder	27	Antwerp	Pale Blue	Winner

* at the start of the contest

==== Results summary ====
Place	Contestant	Week 1	Week 2	Week 3	Week 4	Week 5	Week 6	Week 7	Week 8	Final
1	Deborah	Safe	Bottom 2	Safe	Safe	Safe	Safe	Safe	Safe	Winner
2	Fleur	Safe	Safe	Safe	Safe	Safe	Safe	Safe	Bottom 2	Runner-up
3	Liv	Safe	Safe	Safe	Safe	Safe	Bottom 2	Bottom 2	Safe	Third Place
4	Katrien	Safe	Safe	Safe	Safe	Safe	Safe	Safe	Eliminated	Eliminated
5	Elke	Safe	Safe	Safe	Safe	Safe	Safe	Eliminated	Eliminated	
6	Elisabeth	Bottom 2	Safe	Safe	Bottom 2	Safe	Eliminated	Eliminated		
7	Marian	Safe	Safe	Safe	Safe	Quit	Quit			
8	Sandra	Safe	Safe	Bottom 2	Eliminated	Eliminated				
9	Ellen	Safe	Safe	Eliminated	Eliminated					
10	Helen	Safe	Eliminated	Eliminated						
11	Dorien	Eliminated	Eliminated							

=== Live shows ===
The live shows saw the finalists eliminated one by one following both individual and group performances. Once eliminated, the leaving contestant ended the program by leading a performance of "Adieu, vaarwel (So Long, Farewell)" from The Sound of Music with the remaining contestants.

==== Week 1 (April 8, 2009) ====
Following the first week of the competition, Dorien was the first Maria to be eliminated from the competition. The show performances were:

- Group performances:
  - "How Do You Solve A Problem Like Maria?" (from the musical The Sound of Music)
  - "Don't Stop Me Now" (Queen)

Contestants' performances on the first live show
Contestant	Performance Pair	Order	Song	Result
Dorien Ackx	Pair 1	1	"Sweet About Me"	Bottom 2
Elisabeth Herman	Pair 1	2	"All by Myself"	Bottom 2
Marian van Klaveren	Pair 2	3	"Over the Rainbow"	Safe
Fleur Brusselmans	Pair 2	4	"I Kissed a Girl"	Safe
Deborah De Ridder	Solo Performance	5	"I Want You Back"	Safe
Liv van Aelst	Pair 3	6	"So What"	Safe
Elke Buyle	Pair 3	7	"Chasing Pavements"	Safe
Katrien Smets	Pair 4	8	"Samson"	Safe
Ellen Vandervieren	Pair 4	9	"I Say a Little Prayer"	Safe
Sandra Paelinck	Pair 5	10	"Mad About You"	Safe
Helen Geets	Pair 5	11	"Flashdance... What a Feeling"	Safe

Sing-Off

Act	Sing Off Song	Results
Dorien Ackx	"One of Us" from Mamma Mia	Eliminated
Elisabeth Herman	"One of Us" from Mamma Mia	Saved by Verlinde

==== Week 2 (April 15, 2009) ====
The show performances were:

- Group performances:
  - "How Do You Solve A Problem Like Maria?" (from the musical The Sound of Music)
  - "Sisters Are Doin' It for Themselves" (Eurythmics & Aretha Franklin)

Contestants' performances on the second live show
Contestant	Performance Pair	Order	Song	Result
Deborah De Ridder	Pair 1	1	"It's Oh So Quiet"	Bottom 2
Liv van Aelst	Pair 1	2	"Licence to Kill"	Safe
Marian van Klaveren	Pair 2	3	"9 to 5"	Safe
Ellen Vandervieren	Pair 2	4	"Stepping Stone"	Safe
Sandra Paelinck	Pair 3	5	"Girls Just Want to Have Fun"	Safe
Helen Geets	Pair 3	6	"One Moment in Time"	Bottom 2
Elisabeth Herman	Solo Performance 1	7	"Fever"	Safe
Fleur Brusselmans	Solo Performance 2	8	"Hopelessly Devoted to You"	Safe
Katrien Smets	Pair 4	9	"Love Song"	Safe
Elke Buyle	Pair 4	10	"I Don't Want to Dance"	Safe

Sing-Off

Act	Sing Off Song	Results
Deborah De Ridder	"I Know Him So Well" from Chess	Saved by Verlinde
Helen Geets	"I Know Him So Well" from Chess	Eliminated

==== Week 3 (April 22, 2009) ====
The show performances were:

- Group performances:
  - "My Favorite Things" (from the musical The Sound of Music)
  - "Get the Party Started" (Pink)

Contestants' performances on the third live show
Contestant	Performance Pair	Order	Song	Result
Katrien Smets	Pair 1	1	"Sparkling Diamonds"	Safe
Sandra Paelinck	Pair 1	2	"One Day I'll Fly Away"	Bottom 2
Elke Buyle	Pair 2	3	"Dag vreemde man"	Safe
Ellen Vandervieren	Pair 2	4	"Cabaret"	Bottom 2
Marian van Klaveren	Solo Performance 1	5	"Sway"	Safe
Liv van Aelst	Pair 3	6	"Because of You"	Safe
Fleur Brusselmans	Pair 3	7	"The Boy Does Nothing"	Safe
Deborah De Ridder	Solo Performance 2	8	"Can You Feel the Love Tonight"	Safe
Elisabeth Herman	Solo Performance 3	9	"Papa"	Safe

Sing-Off

Act	Sing Off Song	Results
Sandra Paelinck	"Take That Look Off Your Face" from Tell Me on a Sunday	Saved by Verlinde
Ellen Vandervieren	"Take That Look Off Your Face" from Tell Me on a Sunday	Eliminated

==== Week 4 (April 29, 2009) ====
The show performances were:

- Group performances:
  - "The Sound of Music" (from the musical The Sound of Music)
  - "Dreamgirls" (from the musical Dreamgirls)

Contestants' performances on the fourth live show
Contestant	Performance Pair	Order	Song	Result
Fleur Brusselmans	Pair 1	1	"Big Spender"	Safe
Liv van Aelst	Pair 1	2	"Hij kan niet zonder mij (As Long as He Needs Me)"	Safe
Elisabeth Herman	Pair 2	3	"If I Were a Boy"	Bottom 2
Deborah De Ridder	Pair 2	4	"Mannen (Men)"	Safe
Sandra Paelinck	Solo Performance 1	5	"Al de jazz (All That Jazz)"	Bottom 2
Marian van Klaveren	Pair 3	6	"Afscheid nemen bestaat niet"	Safe
Elke Buyle	Pair 3	7	"Mamma Mia"	Safe
Katrien Smets	Solo Performance 2	8	"Supercalifragilisticexpialidocious"	Safe

Sing-Off

Act	Sing Off Song	Results
Elisabeth Herman	"For Once in My Life" by Stevie Wonder	Saved by Verlinde
Sandra Paelinck	"For Once in My Life" by Stevie Wonder	Eliminated

==== Week 5 (May 6, 2009) ====
The show performances were:

- Group performances:
  - "The Lonely Goatherd" (from the musical The Sound of Music)
  - "Ain't No Mountain High Enough" (Marvin Gaye & Tammi Terrell)

Contestants' performances on the fifth live show
Contestant	Performance Pair	Order	Song	Result
Elke Buyle	Pair 1	1	"Non, je ne regrette rien"	Safe
Liv van Aelst	Pair 1	2	"I Feel Pretty	Safe
Elisabeth Herman	Solo Performance 1	3	"Shout"	Safe
Katrien Smets	Pair 2	4	"Na Die Ontmoeting (Now That I've Seen Her)"	Safe
Fleur Brusselmans	Pair 2	5	"Brussel"	Safe
Marian van Klaveren	Solo Performance 2	6	"Makin' Whoopee"	Withdrew
Deborah De Ridder	Solo Performance 3	7	"When You Believe"	Safe

- Sing-off:
  - Due to Marian van Klaveren's withdrawal, there was no sing-off that week.

==== Week 6 (May 13, 2009) ====
The show performances were:

- Group performances:
  - "I Have Confidence" (from the musical The Sound of Music)
  - "Do-Re-Mi" (from the musical The Sound of Music) featuring the children, who will play as the Von Trapp children in the upcoming Flemish revival of The Sound of Music
  - "Cell Block Tango" (from the musical Chicago)

Contestants' performances on the sixth live show
Contestant	Order	Song	Result
Deborah De Ridder		"Ik leef voor jou"	Safe
Elisabeth Herman		"Het is over"	Eliminated
Elke Buyle		"Huil niet om mij, Argentina (Don't Cry for Me Argentina)"	Safe
Fleur Brusselmans		"I Could Have Danced All Night"	Safe
Katrien Smets		"Hij speelt een spel (May Be I Like It This Way)"	Safe
Liv van Aelst		"Roxanne"	Bottom two

- Sing-off:
  - Elisabeth Herman and Liv van Aelst were in the sing-off, and performed "De roos" by Ann Christy.
  - Albert Verlinde chose to save Liv and bid farewell to Elisabeth.

==== Week 7 (May 20, 2009) ====
In the quarter-final, the seventh Maria to be eliminated was Elke. The show performances were:

- Group performances:
  - "Dingen waar ik zoveel van hou" (from the musical The Sound of Music)
  - "Don't Rain on My Parade" (from the musical Funny Girl)

Contestants' performances on the seventh live show
Contestant	Order	First song	Order	Second song	Result
Deborah De Ridder		"Buenos Aires"		"Heel alleen (On My Own)"	Safe
Elke Buyle		"Meisje en het beest (Beauty and the Beast)"		"Good Morning Baltimore"	Eliminated
Fleur Brusselmans		"Jij woont in mijn hart (You'll Be in My Heart)"		"Popular"	Safe
Katrien Smets		"Ik ben een brassband (I'm a Brass Band)"		"Maybe This Time"	Safe
Liv van Aelst		"Get Happy"		"Al je koffers op de gang maar weer (Another Suitcase in Another Hall)"	Eliminated

- Sing-off:
  - Elke Buyle and Liv van Aelst were in the sing-off, and performed "The Winner Takes It All" from the musical Mamma Mia.
  - Albert Verlinde chose to save Liv and bid farewell to Elke.

==== Week 8 (May 27, 2009) ====
In the semi-final, the eighth and final Maria to be eliminated was Katrien. The show performances were:

- Group performances:
  - "De boer en de boerin" (from the musical The Sound of Music)
  - "Aquarius/Let the Sunshine In" (from the musical Hair)

Contestants' performances on the eighth live show
Contestant	Order	First song	Order	Second song	Result
Deborah De Ridder		"Minutewals"		"Memory"	Safe
Fleur Brusselmans		"Het glipt door m'n vingers (Slipping Through My Fingers)"		"If You Hadn't, But You Did"	Bottom 2
Katrien Smets		"Love You I Do"		"Zalig zijn (Wouldn't It Be Loverly)"	Eliminated
Liv van Aelst		"Anyone Who Had a Heart"		"Een nieuw leven (A New Life)"	Safe

- Sing-off:
  - Fleur Brusselmans and Katrien Smets were in the sing-off, and performed "Let It Be " by The Beatles.
  - Albert Verlinde chose to save Fleur and bid farewell to Katrien.

==== Week 9 (June 3, 2009) ====
The show performances were:

- Group performances:
  - Finalists and former Marias: "Kunnen we iets beginnen met Maria (How Do You Solve a Problem Like Maria?)" (from the musical The Sound of Music)
  - Deborah and Fleur: "Ik kan heel de wereld aan (I Have Confidence)" (from the musical The Sound of Music)

Contestants' performances on the ninth live show
Act	Order	Song of the Series	Order	The Sound of Music song	Order	Song	Result
Deborah De Ridder		"Voor wie gelooft (When You Believe)"		"De boer en de boerin (The Lonely Goatherd)"		"Astonishing"	Winner
Fleur Brusselmans		"The Boy Does Nothing"		"Do-Re-Mi" (Dutch version)		"Ik ben de perfectie" (Practically Perfect)"	Runner-up
Liv van Aelst		"Hij kan niet zonter mij (As Long as He Needs Me)"		"Iets waar ik zielsveel van hou (My Favorite Things)"	N/A	N/A (already eliminated)	3rd Place (Eliminated)

- After being announced as the season winner, Deborah concluded the season with a performance of "De muziek van de hoogste bergen (The Sound of Music)".

== Netherlands ==
=== Expert panel ===
An expert panel provided advice to the contestants throughout the series, and provided comments during the live shows. The panel was made up of:

- Pia Douwes, (head judge and musical theatre actress who is very successful in Europe)
- Jamai Loman, (actor and singer)
- Carline Brouwer, (worldwide musical assistant director)
- Richard Groenendijk, (comedian, actor, presenter and lyricist)

=== Finalists ===
Finalists
Finalist	Age & Date of Birth *	Dress Colour	Status
Sylvia Boone	29 (3 July 1991)	Royal Blue	Eliminated 1st in week 1
Willemijn Maandag	25 (25 December 1995)	Light Pink	Eliminated 2nd in week 2
Sanne Den Besten	29 (23 May 1991)	Bright Green	Eliminated 3rd in week 3
Renée De Gruijl	27 (22 March 1993)	Hot Pink	Eliminated 4th in week 4
Anouk Van Laake	25 (5 October 1995)	Yellow-Green	Eliminated 5th in week 5
Jolijn Henneman	29 (14 September 1991)	Purple	Eliminated 6th-7th in week 6
Valerie Curlingford	31 (3 December 1989)	Daisy Yellow	Eliminated 6th-7th in week 6
Tessa Sunniva Van Tol	29 (9 September 1991)	Sea Blue	Third place
Natascha Molly	25 (25 December 1995)	Salmon Orange	Second place
Nandi Van Beurden	30 (18 February 1991)	Italian Red	Winner

=== Live shows ===
The live shows saw the finalists eliminated one by one following both individual and group performances. Once eliminated, the leaving contestant ended the programme by leading a performance of "Bergen of Dalen" (Climb Every Mountain) from The Sound of Music with the remaining contestants, Unlike the Flemish version of Op zoek naar Maria and the British and Canadian versions of How Do You Solve A Problem Like Maria, which their elimination song was "So Long, Farewell" (Tot snel, vaarwel) from The Sound of Music. After being announced as the winner, Nandi concluded the show with a performance of "Iets Waar Ik Zielsveel Van Hou" (My Favorite Things).

=== Jury's favourite Maria ===
Liveshows	Carline Brouwer	Richard Groenendijk	Jamai Loman
Liveshow 1	Natascha Molly	Sanne den Besten	Nandi van Beurden
Liveshow 2	Nandi van Beurden	Nandi van Beurden	Renée de Gruijl
Liveshow 3	Valerie Curlingford	Natascha Molly	Nandi van Beurden
Liveshow 4	Nandi van Beurden	Jolijn Henneman	Nandi van Beurden
Liveshow 5	Tessa Sunniva Van Tol	Tessa Sunniva Van Tol	Nandi van Beurden
Liveshow 6	Natascha Molly	Natascha Molly	Natascha Molly
Liveshow 7	*	Natascha Molly	Nandi van Beurden

- (*) Carline and Pia couldn't make a choice

=== Elimination chart ===
Place	Contestant	Show 1	Show 2	Show 3	Show 4	Show 5	Show 6	Show 7
1	Nandi Van Beurden							Winner
2	Natascha Molly							Runner-up
3	Tessa Sunniva Van Tol			Btm 2			Btm 3	Third Place
4	Valerie Curlingford				Btm 2	Btm 2	Elim	
5	Jolijn Henneman						Elim	
6	Anouk Van Laake		Btm 2			Elim		
7	Renée De Gruijl				Elim			
8	Sanne Den Besten			Elim				
9	Willemijn Maandag	Btm 2	Elim					
10	Sylvia Boone	Elim						

=== Performances ===
Nandi Van Beurden

- Week 1 - Leven is cabaret (Cabaret)
- Week 2 - Colors of the Wind
- Week 3 - It's Oh So Quiet
- Week 4 - Singin' In The Rain
- Week 5 - Just Give Me a Reason
- Week 6 Song 1 - This Is My Life
- Week 6 Song 2 - Stille liefde
- Week 7 (Final) Song 1 - All That Matters
- Week 7 (Final) Song 2 - Ergens in de sterren (Written in the Stars) (Duet with William Spaaij)
- Week 7 (Final) Song 3 - De muziek van de hoogste bergen (The Sound of Music)
- Week 7 (Final) Song 4 (Winner's song) - Iets Waar Ik Zielsveel Van Hou (My Favorite Things)

Natascha Molly

- Week 1 - Something's Got a Hold on Me
- Week 2 - Make You Feel My Love
- Week 3 - Don't Rain On My Parade
- Week 4 - Denk Aan Mij (Think Of Me)
- Week 5 - River Deep, Mountain High
- Week 6 Song 1 - Heel alleen (On My Own)
- Week 6 Song 2 - Get Happy
- Week 7 (Final) Song 1 - And I Am Telling You I'm Not Going
- Week 7 (Final) Song 2 - Meer vraag ik niet van jou (All I Ask of You) (Duet with René van Kooten)
- Week 7 (Final) Song 3 - De muziek van de hoogste bergen (The Sound of Music)

Tessa Sunniva Van Tol

- Week 1 - Always Remember Us This Way
- Week 2 - Mamma Mia
- Week 3 - Huil niet voor mij Argentina (Don't Cry for Me Argentina)
- Week 4 - All Die Jazz (All That Jazz)
- Week 5 - I Feel Pretty
- Week 6 Song 1 - Heel even
- Week 6 Song 2 - Diamonds Are a Girl's Best Friend
- Week 7 (Final) Song 1 - Mijn leven is van mij (I Belong to Me)
- Week 7 (Final) Song 2 - Beauty and the Beast (Duet with Milan van Waardenburg)

Valerie Curlingford

- Week 1 - Zeg me dat het niet zo
- Week 2 - How Will I Know
- Week 3 - Roar
- Week 4 - Inspiratie
- Week 5 - One Day I'll Fly Away
- Week 6 Song 1 - Tamelijk Voortreffelijk (Practically Perfect)
- Week 6 Song 2 - Your Song

Jolijn Henneman

- Week 1 - Arcade
- Week 2 - Hit the Road Jack
- Week 3 - Kom terug en dans met mij (I Could Have Danced All Night)
- Week 4 - Jolene
- Week 5 - Non, je ne regrette rien
- Week 6 Song 1 - Walking on Sunshine
- Week 6 Song 2 - Dit keer (Maybe This Time)

Anouk Van Laake

- Week 1 - Popular
- Week 2 - Omarm
- Week 3 - Let's Hear It for the Boy
- Week 4 - Somewhere
- Week 5 - Het dorp

Renée De Gruijl

- Week 1 - Somebody to Love
- Week 2 - Hopelessly Devoted To You
- Week 3 - Geef mij nu je angst
- Week 4 - Zeur Niet

Sanne Den Besten

- Week 1 - The Lady Is a Tramp
- Week 2 - Door De Wind
- Week 3 - Somewhere Over the Rainbow

Willemijn Maandag

- Week 1 - Don't You Worry 'bout a Thing
- Week 2 - Baby One More Time

Sylvia Boone

- Week 1 - Duurt Te Lang

Opening songs

- Week 1 - Medley (7 Rings/I Hope I Get It/Dream Girls/Maria/Ave Maria)
- Week 2 - You Can't Hurry Love
- Week 3 - One Night Only
- Week 4 - This Is Me
- Week 5 - A Brand New Day
- Week 6 - Fame
- Week 7 (Final) - The Greatest Show

Group songs

- Week 1 - I'm Still Standing
- Week 2 - The Edge of Glory
- Week 3 - Shake It Off
- Week 4 - Moves like Jagger
- Week 5 - New York, New York
- Week 6 - There's No Business Like Show Business
- Week 7 (Final) 1 - I Will Follow Him
- Week 7 (Final) 2 - Nandi & Natascha - De muziek van de hoogste bergen (The Sound of Music)

Group of 3 people songs (Week 5 only)

- Nandi, Natascha & Valerie - Love Me Just A Little Bit More
- Tessa, Jolijn & Anouk - Candyman

Sing-offs

- Week 1 - Sylvia & Willemijn - Hallelujah
- Week 2 - Willemijn & Anouk - Laat Me
- Week 3 - Sanne & Tessa - Zonder jou
- Week 4 - Valerie & Renée - I Know Him So Well
- Week 5 - Anouk & Valerie - Avond
- Week 6 - Valerie, Jolijn & Tessa - Nog één kans

The Bottom 2 or 3 Marias voted by the public each week had to sing a contrasting song, then Pia Douwes would choose one of them to carry on in the competition.
