= Op zoek naar Joseph =

- Starring: Frits Sissing (Host); Pia Douwes (Judge); Erwin van Lambaart (Judge); Paul de Leeuw (Judge)
- Country of origin: Netherlands
- No. of seasons: 1

Production
- Producer: Eyeworks

Original release
- Network: AVRO
- Release: 30 August – 26 October 2008

Related
- Op zoek naar Evita; Op zoek naar Mary Poppins

Op zoek naar Joseph (Looking for Joseph) is a 2008 talent show-themed television series produced by the AVRO in the Netherlands. It searched for a new, unknown lead to play Joseph in a 2009 Dutch revival of the Andrew Lloyd Webber musical Joseph and the Amazing Technicolor Dreamcoat.

The show was hosted by Frits Sissing, who announced Freek Bartels as the winner of the final public telephone vote on 26 October 2008.

It was the second Dutch talent show to be produced by the AVRO/Willem Nijholt, after Op zoek naar Evita. A third talent show, this time called Op zoek naar Mary Poppins aired in 2009, Op zoek naar Zorro aired in late 2010, Op zoek naar Annie aired in 2012, Op zoek naar Maria aired in 2021 and Op zoek naar Danny & Sandy aired in late 2022.

A similar format has been used as well in the United Kingdom in 2007, with the show Any Dream Will Do taking an unknown singer and placing the winner in the lead role for the 2007 performances in the West End. On 9 June 2007, Lee Mead was announced the winner of this show.

== Format ==
=== Expert panel ===
An expert panel provided advice to the contestants throughout the series, and provided comments during the live shows. The panel was made up of:

- Pia Douwes, (musical theatre actress who is very successful in Europe)
- Erwin van Lambaarts (managing director of Joop van den Ende theatre)
- Paul de Leeuw (television comedian, actor and singer)
- Willem Nijholt (head judge and actor and singer.)

=== Live finals ===
The final eleven contestants competed in the live studio finals held on Sunday nights over eight weeks. Each week the contestants sang and performed during the live show, receiving comments from the judges following their performance. The public then got a chance to vote for their favourite Joseph, and the two contestants with the fewest votes performed a sing-off in front of Nijholt, who then decided which Joseph to keep in the contest. This was repeated with the top ten, the top nine, the top eight, the top seven, the top six, the top five and the top four.

Nijholt had no say in the final casting decision, when in the concluding edition of the series it was left to the public to choose who should play Joseph out of the final two contenders, Freek Bartels and John Vooijs. After more votes were cast, the winning entrant was revealed as Bartels, who won a contract to play Joseph at the Stadsschouwburg in Amsterdam.

== Finalists ==
Eleven potential Josephs made it through the auditions process to perform during the live shows.

Finalist	Age*	Date of birth	Coat colour	Status
Robbert van den Bergh	25	March 10, 1983	Pastel blue	Eliminated 1st in week 1
Adriaan Korrnenberg	25	October 1, 1982	Pink	Eliminated 2nd in week 2
Hein Gerrits	27	May 9, 1981	Lime green	Eliminated 3rd in week 3
Remko Harms	26	November 5, 1981	Dark green	Eliminated 4th in week 3
Baer Jonkers	24	May 29, 1984	Dark blue	Eliminated 5th in week 4
Amir Vahidi	18	August 1, 1990	Red	Eliminated 6th in week 5
Mathijs Pater	24	January 17, 1984	Light blue	Eliminated 7th in week 6
Robin van den Akker	29	July 21, 1979	Turquoise	Eliminated 8th in week 7
Roy van Iersel	21	September 11, 1986	Yellow	Third place
John Vooijs	29	March 26, 1979	Purple	Second place
Freek Bartels	21	October 24, 1986	Orange	Winner

* at the start of the contest

=== Results summary ===
Results summary
Place	Contestant	Week 1	Week 2	Week 3		Week 4	Week 5	Week 6	Week 7	Final
Place	Contestant	Week 1	Week 2	Part 1	Part 2	Week 4	Week 5	Week 6	Week 7	Final
1	Freek	Safe	Safe	Safe	Safe	Safe	Safe	Safe	Safe	Winner
2	John	Safe	Safe	Safe	Safe	Safe	Bottom 2	Safe	Safe	Second place
3	Roy	Bottom 2	Safe	Safe	Safe	Safe	Safe	Safe	Bottom 2	Third place
4	Robin	Safe	Safe	Safe	Bottom 2	Bottom 2	Safe	Bottom 2	Eliminated	Eliminated
5	Mathijs	Safe	Safe	Safe	Safe	Safe	Safe	Eliminated	Eliminated	
6	Amir	Safe	Safe	Safe	Safe	Safe	Eliminated	Eliminated		
7	Baer	Safe	Safe	Bottom 2	Safe	Eliminated	Eliminated			
8	Remko	Safe	Safe	Safe	Eliminated	Eliminated				
9	Hein	Safe	Bottom 2	Eliminated	Eliminated					
10	Adriaan	Safe	Eliminated	Eliminated						
11	Robbert	Eliminated	Eliminated							

== Live shows ==
The live shows saw the finalists eliminated one by one following both individual and group performances. Once eliminated, eliminated Joseph then performed "Arme Jozef (Poor, Poor Joseph)\Sluit alle deuren (Close Every Door)" together with the remaining Josephs as his grand exit song, symbolically handing back his dreamcoat.

=== Week 1 (September 7, 2008) ===
Following the first week of competition, Robbert was the first Joseph to be eliminated from the competition. The show performances were:

- Group performances:
  - "Go, Go, Go Joseph" (from Joseph and the Amazing Technicolor Dreamcoat)
  - "Help!" (The Beatles)

Contestants' performances on the first live show
Contestant	Performance Pair	Order	Song	Result
Roy van Iersel	Pair 1	1	"Nu (Now)"	Bottom 2
Freek Bartels	Pair 1	2	"I Want to Break Free"	Safe
Remko Harms	Pair 2	3	"Waarom God (Why God Why)"	Safe
Adriaan Kroonenberg	Pair 2	4	"Vlieg met me mee"	Safe
Hein Gerrits	Pair 3	5	"Toen ik je zag"	Safe
Robbert van den Bergh	Pair 3	6	"Walking on Sunshine"	Bottom 2
Mathijs Pater	Solo Performance	7	"Go the Distance"	Safe
Robin van den Akker	Pair 4	8	"Faith"	Safe
Baer Jonkers	Pair 4	9	"Maria"	Safe
Amir Vahidi	Pair 5	10	"Your Song"	Safe
John Vooijs	Pair 5	11	"Livin' on a Prayer"	Safe

- Jury's favourite Joseph:
  - Erwin van Lambaart: Mathijs
  - Pia Douwes: Mathijs
  - Paul de Leeuw: Amir

Sing-Off

Act	Sing Off Song	Results
Roy van Iersel	"You'll Never Walk Alone" from Carousel	Saved by Nijholt
Robbert van der Bergh	"You'll Never Walk Alone" from Carousel	Eliminated

=== Week 2 (September 14, 2008) ===
Adriaan was the second contestant to be eliminated from the series. The show performances were:

- Group performances:
  - "Livin La Vida Loca" (Ricky Martin)
  - "Luck Be a Lady" (from Guys and Dolls)

Contestants' performances on the second live show
Contestant	Performance Pair	Order	Song	Result
Amir Vahidi	Pair 1	1	"Ik leef niet meer voor jou"	Safe
Adriaan Kroonenberg	Pair 1	2	"On the Street Where You Live"	Bottom 2
John Vooijs	Pair 2	3	"Lang is de nacht (Endless Night)"	Safe
Baer Jonkers	Pair 2	4	"Mack the Knife"	Safe
Freek Bartels	Pair 3	5	"Het gaat beginnen (Something's Coming)"	Safe
Remko Harms	Pair 3	6	"It's Not Unusual"	Safe
Robin van den Akker	Pair 4	7	"Papa"	Safe
Hein Gerrits	Pair 4	8	"Working My Way Back to You"	Bottom 2
Mathijs Pater	Pair 5	9	"Fever"	Safe
Roy van Iersel	Pair 5	10	"Alsof je bij me bent"	Safe

- Jury's favourite Joseph:
  - Erwin van Lambaart: Freek
  - Pia Douwes: Roy
  - Paul de Leeuw: Robin

Sing-Off

Act	Sing Off Song	Results
Hein Gerrits	"Ergens in de sterren (Written in the Stars)" from Aida	Saved by Nijholt
Adriaan Kroonenberg	"Ergens in de sterren (Written in the Stars)" from Aida	Eliminated

=== Week 3 (September 21, 2008) ===
In a double elimination, two Josephs were voted off the series. The show performances were:

- Group performances:
  - "Ladies' Choice" (Zac Efron)
  - "Total Eclipse of the Heart" (Bonnie Tyler)

Contestants' performances on the third live show
Contestant	Performance Pair	Order	Song	Results Part 1	Results Part 2
Baer Jonkers	Pair 1	1	"Signed, Sealed, Delivered I'm Yours"	Bottom 2	Safe
Mathijs Pater	Pair 1	2	"Sandy"	Safe	Safe
Roy van Iersel	Pair 2	3	"Paint It, Black"	Safe	Safe
Remko Harms	Pair 2	4	"Van Haar Te Houden (If I Can't Love Her)"	Safe	Bottom 2
Hein Gerrits	Solo Performance	5	"Radeloos (First and Last\Tragedy)"	Bottom 2	N/A (already eliminated)
Amir Vahidi	Pair 3	6	"All I Care About is Love"	Safe	Safe
John Vooijs	Pair 3	7	"De vleugels van mijn vlucht (Wind Beneath My Wings)"	Safe	Safe
Freek Bartels	Pair 4	8	"Man in the Mirror"	Safe	Safe
Robin van den Akker	Pair 4	9	"Zij leven voort (They Live In You)"	Safe	Bottom 2

- Jury's favourite Joseph:
  - Erwin van Lambaart: John
  - Pia Douwes: Robin
  - Paul de Leeuw: Freek

Sing-off 1:

Act	Sing Off Song	Results
Baer Jonkers	"The Impossible Dream" from Man of La Mancha	Saved by Nijholt
Hein Gerrits	"The Impossible Dream" from Man of La Mancha	Eliminated

Sing-off 2:

Act	Sing Off Song	Results
Remko Harms	"Laat Me" by Ramses Shaffy	Eliminated
Robin van den Akker	"Laat Me" by Ramses Shaffy	Saved by Nijholt

=== Week 4 (September 28, 2008) ===
Baer became the fourth contestant to hear he was not Joseph. The show performances were:

- Group performances:
  - "Greased Lightning" (from Grease)
  - "Beat It" (Michael Jackson)

Contestants' performances on the fourth live show
Contestant	Performance Pair	Order	Song	Result
Robin van den Akker	Pair 1	1	"Ain't That a Kick in the Head?"	Bottom 2
Baer Jonkers	Pair 1	2	"Alles is liefde"	Bottom 2
Freek Bartels	Pair 2	3	"Yesterday"	Safe
John Vooijs	Pair 2	4	"Oorlog in mij"	Safe
Roy van Iersel	Solo Performance	5	"Everything"	Safe
Mathijs Pater	Pair 3	6	"Proud of Your Boy"	Safe
Amir Vahidi	Pair 3	7	"Ik vroeg te veel"	Safe

- Jury's favourite Joseph:
  - Erwin van Lambaart: Mathijs
  - Pia Douwes: Roy
  - Paul de Leeuw: Roy

Sing-Off

Act	Sing Off Song	Results
Baer Jonkers	"Hoog vloog je, te hoog (High Flying Adored)" from Evita	Eliminated
Robin van den Akker	"Hoog vloog je, te hoog (High Flying Adored)" from Evita	Saved by Nijholt

=== Week 5 (October 5, 2008) ===
With only six finalists remaining, the Josephs were announced in sets of three and performed in a trio as well as their individual performances. Amir became the fifth contestant to hear he would not be Joseph. The show performances were:

- Group performances:
  - "Een Voor Allen, Allen Voor Een (All For One, One For All)" (from 3 Musketiers)
  - Freek, John and Mathijs: "Zomer een dag" (Willeke Alberti)
  - Roy, Robin and Amir: "Zing, Vecht, Huil, Bid, Lach, Werk En Bewonder" (Ramses Shaffy)
  - "Moeder, ik wil bij de revue" (Wim Sonneveld)

Contestants' performances on the fifth live show
Contestant	Performance Pair	Order	Song	Result
John Vooijs	Pair 1	1	"Kon ik nog maar even bij je zijn"	Bottom 2
Freek Bartels	Pair 1	2	"Kom Kees"	Safe
Mathijs Pater	Pair 2	3	"Laat me niet alleen (Ne me quitte pas)"	Safe
Amir Vahidi	Pair 2	4	"Terug naar toen (Journey to the Past)"	Bottom 2
Robin van den Akker	Pair 3	5	"Verloren verleden (Everything That I Am)"	Safe
Roy van Iersel	Pair 3	6	"Waar is de zon?"	Safe

- Jury's favourite Joseph:
  - Erwin van Lambaart: Mathijs
  - Pia Douwes: John
  - Paul de Leeuw: John

Sing-Off

Act	Sing Off Song	Results
John Vooijs	"Zij gelooft in mij (She Believes in Me)" by André Hazes	Saved by Nijholt
Amir Vahidi	"Zij gelooft in mij (She Believes in Me)" by André Hazes	Eliminated

=== Week 6 (October 12, 2008) ===
In the quarter-final, the sixth Joseph to be eliminated was Mathijs. The show performances were:

- Group performances:
  - "I'm Still Standing" (Elton John)
  - "Don't Stop Me Now" (from We Will Rock You)

Contestants' performances on the sixth live show
Contestant	Order	First song	Order	Second song	Result
Robin van den Akker	1	"Crazy Little Thing Called Love"	6	"Sinds een dag of twee"	Bottom 2
John Vooijs	2	"One Song Glory"	8	"Hocus Pocus"	Safe
Freek Bartels	3	"Ga nou maar gewoon (Ease On down the Road)"	7	"This is the Moment"	Safe
Mathijs Pater	4	"Chim Chim Cher-ee"	10	"Copacabana"	Bottom 2
Roy van Iersel	5	"Jailhouse Rock"	9	"Lege Stoelen, Lege Tafels (Empty Chairs at Empty Tables)"	Safe

- Jury's favourite Joseph:
  - Erwin van Lambaart: Freek
  - Pia Douwes: Freek
  - Paul de Leeuw: John

Sing-Off

Act	Sing Off Song	Results
Robin van den Akker	"Pak maar m'n hand" by Nick & Simon	Saved by Nijholt
Mathijs Pater	"Pak maar m'n hand" by Nick & Simon	Eliminated

=== Week 7 (October 19, 2008) ===
In the semi-final, the seventh and final Joseph to be eliminated was Robin. The show performances were:

- Group performances:
  - "I Just Can't Wait To Be King" (from The Lion King)
  - "Elephant Love Medley" (from Moulin Rouge) featuring Brigitte Heitzer

Contestants' performances on the seventh live show
Contestant	Order	First song	Order	Second song	Result
Freek Bartels	1	"Vanmorgen vloog ze nog"	5	"You Raise Me Up"	Safe
Roy van Iersel	2	"New York, New York"	6	"Onbeschirjfelijk Mooi (Indiscribablely Beautiful)"	Bottom 2
Robin van den Akker	3	"Lef"	7	"Mr. Bojangles"	Bottom 2
John Vooijs	4	"Anyone Who Had a Heart"	8	"Nooit een acht"	Safe

- Jury's favourite Joseph:
  - Erwin van Lambaart: Freek
  - Pia Douwes: John
  - Paul de Leeuw: John

Sing-Off

Act	Sing Off Song	Results
Roy van Iersel	"Telkens weer" by Willeke Alberti	Saved by Nijholt
Robin van den Akker	"Telkens weer" by Willeke Alberti	Eliminated

=== Week 8 (October 26, 2008) ===
The grand finale saw Freek win the competition, with John coming second and Roy third. The show performances were:

- Group performance:
  - Finalists and former Josephs: "Kop, Op, Nou Jozef (Go, Go, Go Joseph)\Geef Mij Mijn Dromenjas (Give Me My Coloured Coat)" (from Joseph and the Amazing Technicolor Dreamcoat)
  - Finalists: "Do You Love Me" (The Contours)
  - Freek and John: "Mijn Beste Vriend (My Own Best Friend)" (from Chicago)

Contestants' performances on the first live show
Contestant	Order	First song	Order	Second song	Result
Roy van Iersel	1	"Daar Buiten (Out There)"	N/A	N/A (already eliminated)	Eliminated
Freek Bartels	2	"Gethsemane"	4	"Sluit Alle Deuren (Close Every Door)"	Winner
John Vooijs	3	"Verwarrend bestaan (Elaborate Lives)"	5	"Sluit Alle Deuren (Close Every Door)"	Runner-up

- Jury's verdict on who is Joseph:
  - Erwin van Lambaart: Freek
  - Pia Douwes: could not choose between Freek and John
  - Peter Van de Velde: John
  - Willem Nijholt: Roy
- After being announced as the series winner, Freek concluded the series with a performance of "Laat je droom bestaan (Any Dream Will Do)\Geef Mij Mijn Dromenjas (Give Me My Coloured Coat)".

== After the series ==
Freek Bartels, along with the winner of the previous Nijholt reality show Op zoek naar Evita, Brigitte Heitzer, were the stars of a one-off Christmas Day special to air on AVRO, entitled Kerst met Joseph en Evita (Christmas with Joseph and Evita).
