= Op zoek naar Evita =

- Presented by: Frits Sissing
- Judges: Pia Douwes; Erwin van Lambaart; Peter van de Velde
- Country of origin: Netherlands
- No. of seasons: 1
- No. of episodes: 10

Production
- Producer: Eyeworks

Original release
- Network: AVRO
- Release: 19 August – 21 October 2007

Related
- Op zoek naar Joseph (2008); Op zoek naar Mary Poppins (2009); Op zoek naar Zorro (2011); Op zoek naar Annie (2012); Op zoek naar Maria (2021); Op zoek naar Danny & Sandy (2022)

Op zoek naar Evita (Looking for Evita) is a 2007 talent show-themed television series produced by the AVRO in the Netherlands. It documented the search for a new, undiscovered musical theatre performer to play the role of Eva Peron in the 2008 Andrew Lloyd Webber musical Evita.

The show was hosted by Frits Sissing, who announced Brigitte Heitzer as the winner of the final public telephone vote on 21 October 2007, and masterminded by Willem Nijholt.

It became the first of a series of the Dutch themed talent contests to be produced by the AVRO in collaboration with Willem Nijholt. Op zoek naar Joseph followed in 2008 to find a new male lead to play Joseph for Joseph and the Amazing Technicolor Dreamcoat, In 2009, it was followed by Op zoek naar Mary Poppins searching for a new lead to play Mary Poppins in a production of the musical Mary Poppins, In 2010, it was followed by Op zoek naar Zorro searching for a new lead to play Zorro in a production of the musical Zorro, Ten years later in 2021, it was followed by Op zoek naar Maria searching for a new lead to play Maria in a production of the musical The Sound of Music. In 2022, it was followed by Op zoek naar Danny & Sandy searching for a new lead to play Danny & Sandy in a production of the musical Grease.

== Format ==
=== Expert panel ===
To assess and train the potential Evitas and judge them during the live shows, an expert panel was chosen. The panel included:

- Willem Nijholt – actor and singer.
- Peter Van de Velde – Flemish actor from Belgium
- Erwin van Lambaart – (managing director of Joop van den Ende theatre)
- Pia Douwes – (musical theatre actress who is very successful in Europe)

=== Live finals ===
The final ten contestants competed in the live studio finals held on Sunday nights over eight weeks. Each week the contestants sang and performed during the live show, receiving comments from the judges following their performance. The public then got a chance to vote for their favourite Evita, and the two contestants with the fewest votes performed a sing-off in front of Nijholt, who then decided which Evita to keep in the contest. This was repeated with the top ten, the top nine, the top eight, the top seven, the top six, the top five and the top four.

Nijholt had no say in the final casting decision, when in the concluding edition of the series it was left to the public to choose who should play Evita out of the final two contenders, Brigitte Heitzer and Suzan Seegers. After more votes were cast, the winning entrant was revealed as Heitzer, who won a contract to play Evita at the Nieuwe Luxor Theater in Rotterdam.

== Finalists ==
Ten potential Evitas made it through the auditions process to perform during the live shows.

Finalist	Age*	Date of birth	Dress colour	Status
Tineke Blok	25	21 April 1982	Light pink	Eliminated 1st in week 1
Sabina Petra	26	23 April 1981	Light green	Eliminated 2nd in week 2
Sophie Veldhuizen	24	6 March 1983	Dark pink	Eliminated 3rd in week 3
Babette Holtman	26	27 May 1981	Orange	Eliminated 4th in week 4
Wieneke Remmers	28	12 August 1978	Light blue	Eliminated 5th in week 5
Anne Stalman	25	29 November 1981	Dark green	Eliminated 6th in week 6
Marleen van der Loo	37	2 January 1970	Dark blue	Eliminated 7th in week 7
Marjolein Teepen	27	6 August 1980	Yellow	Third place
Suzan Seegers	26	13 November 1980	Purple	Second place
Brigitte Heitzer	28	23 August 1979	Red	Winner

* at the start of the contest

=== Results summary ===
Results summary
Place	Contestant	Week 1	Week 2	Week 3	Week 4	Week 5	Week 6	Week 7	Final
1	Brigitte	Safe	Safe	Safe	Safe	Safe	Safe	Safe	Winner
2	Suzan	Safe	Safe	Safe	Safe	Safe	Safe	Safe	Second place
3	Marjolein	Safe	Safe	Safe	Safe	Safe	Safe	Bottom 2	Third place
4	Marleen	Safe	Safe	Safe	Safe	Safe	Bottom 2	Eliminated	Eliminated
5	Anne	Safe	Bottom 2	Bottom 2	Safe	Bottom 2	Eliminated	Eliminated	
6	Wieneke	Safe	Safe	Safe	Bottom 2	Eliminated	Eliminated		
7	Babette	Safe	Safe	Safe	Eliminated	Eliminated			
8	Sophie	Bottom 2	Safe	Eliminated	Eliminated				
9	Sabina	Safe	Eliminated	Eliminated					
10	Tineke	Eliminated	Eliminated						

== Live shows ==
The live shows saw the finalists eliminated one by one following both individual and group performances. Once eliminated, the leaving contestant ended the programme by receiving a suitcase and leading a performance of "Dag en bedankt nog (Goodnight and Thank You)\Jij blijft bij mij (You Must Love Me)" from Evita with the remaining contestants.

=== Week 1 (September 2, 2007) ===
Following the first week of competition, Tineke was the first Evita to be eliminated from the competition. The show performances were:

- Group performances:
  - "Dreamgirls" (from Dreamgirls)
  - "Rhythm of the Night" (DeBarge)

Contestants' performances on the first live show
Contestant	Performance Pair	Order	Song	Result
Marjolein Teepen	Pair 1	1	"Flashdance... What a Feeling"	Safe
Anne Stalman	Pair 1	2	"One Moment in Time"	Safe
Sabina Petra	Pair 2	3	"Als ze mij zo zouwen zien (If My Friends Could See Me Now)"	Safe
Wieneke Remmers	Pair 2	4	"One Day I'll Fly Away"	Safe
Tineke Blok	Pair 3	5	"These Boots Are Made for Walking"	Bottom 2
Marleen van der Loo	Pair 3	6	"Inspiratie"	Safe
Brigitte Heitzer	Pair 4	7	"It's Oh So Quiet"	Safe
Babette Holtman	Pair 4	8	"The Way We Were"	Safe
Sophie Veldhuizen	Pair 5	9	"Cabaret"	Bottom 2
Suzan Seegers	Pair 5	10	"Because of You"	Safe

- Jury's favourite Evita:
  - Erwin van Lambaart: Suzan (but revealed that his other favourite was Marjolein, but was positive about Suzan)
  - Pia Douwes: Suzan
  - Peter Van de Velde: Brigitte

Sing-Off

Act	Sing Off Song	Results
Tineke Blok	"I Don't Know How to Love Him" from Jesus Christ Superstar	Eliminated
Sophie Veldhuizen	"I Don't Know How to Love Him" from Jesus Christ Superstar	Saved by Nijholt

=== Week 2 (September 9, 2007) ===
Sabina was the second contestant to be eliminated from the series. The show performances were:

- Group performances:
  - "Diamonds Are a Girl's Best Friend" (from Gentlemen Prefer Blondes)
  - "Can't Help Falling in Love" (Elvis Presley)

Contestants' performances on the second live show
Contestant	Performance Pair	Order	Song	Result
Anne Stalman	Pair 1	1	"Think"	Bottom 2
Sabina Petra	Pair 1	2	"Geen kind meer"	Bottom 2
Marleen van der Loo	Pair 2	3	"Fever"	Safe
Suzan Seegers	Pair 2	4	"Minutenwals"	Safe
Sophie Veldhuizen	Solo Performance	5	"Send in the Clowns"	Safe
Brigitte Heitzer	Pair 3	6	"I Am What I Am"	Safe
Marjolein Teepen	Pair 3	7	"Over the Rainbow"	Safe
Babette Holtman	Pair 4	8	"I'm Every Woman"	Safe
Wieneke Remmers	Pair 4	9	"New York, New York"	Safe

- Jury's favourite Evita:
  - Erwin van Lambaart: Marleen
  - Pia Douwes: Wieneke
  - Peter Van de Velde: Sabina

Sing-Off

Act	Sing Off Song	Results
Anne Stalman	"Memory" from Cats	Saved by Nijholt
Sabina Petra	"Memory" from Cats	Eliminated

=== Week 3 (September 16, 2007) ===
The third potential Evita to be eliminated was Sophie. The show performances were:

- Group performances:
  - "Get the Party Started" (Pink)
  - "Mijn pakkie an (My Strongest Suit)" (from Aida)

Contestants' performances on the third live show
Contestant	Performance Pair	Order	Song	Result
Babette Holtman	Pair 1	1	"Misschien dit keer (Maybe This Time)"	Safe
Brigitte Heitzer	Pair 1	2	"Margherita"	Safe
Sophie Veldhuizen	Pair 2	3	"Waarom zeggen ze nee (Everybody Says Don't)"	Bottom 2
Suzan Seegers	Pair 2	4	"All by Myself"	Safe
Anne Stalman	Pair 3	5	"Na die ontmoeting (Now That I've Seen Her)"	Bottom 2
Wieneke Remmers	Pair 3	6	"Telkens weer"	Safe
Marjolein Teepen	Pair 4	7	"Geen wolken voor mijn zon (Don't Rain on My Parade)"	Safe
Marleen van der Loo	Pair 4	8	"I Will Always Love You"	Safe

- Jury's favourite Evita:
  - Erwin van Lambaart: Suzan
  - Pia Douwes: Marleen
  - Peter Van de Velde: Wieneke

Sing-Off

Act	Sing Off Song	Results
Sophie Veldhuizen	"Beauty and the Beast" from Beauty and the Beast	Eliminated
Anne Stalman	"Beauty and the Beast" from Beauty and the Beast	Saved by Nijholt

=== Week 4 (September 23, 2007) ===
Babette became the fourth contestant to hear she was not Evita. The show performances were:

- Group performances:
  - "We Go Together" (from Grease)
  - "Take a Chance on Me" (from Mamma Mia)

Contestants' performances on the fourth live show
Contestant	Performance Pair	Order	Song	Result
Suzan Seegers	Pair 1	1	"Ik geloof (I Have Confidence)"	Safe
Marleen van der Loo	Pair 1	2	"Stuff Like That There"	Safe
Marjolein Teepen	Pair 2	3	"Ik hou van jou"	Safe
Babette Holtman	Pair 2	4	"Als ik jou niet krijg (If I Can't Have You)"	Bottom 2
Anne Stalman	Solo Performance	5	"Raise the Roof"	Safe
Wieneke Remmers	Pair 3	6	"Take That Look Off Your Face"	Bottom 2
Brigitte Heitzer	Pair 3	7	"Hij kan niet zonder mij (As Long As He Needs Me)"	Safe

- Jury's favourite Evita:
  - Erwin van Lambaart: Babette
  - Pia Douwes: Babette
  - Peter Van de Velde: Babette

Sing-Off

Act	Sing Off Song	Results
Babette Holtman	"Heel alleen (On My Own)" from Les Misérables	Eliminated
Wieneke Remmers	"Heel alleen (On My Own)" from Les Misérables	Saved by Nijholt

=== Week 5 (September 30, 2007) ===
Wieneke became the fifth contestant to hear she would not be Evita. The show performances were:

- Group performances:
  - "Don't Stop Me Now" (from We Will Rock You)
  - "Rainbow High" (from Evita)
  - "It's the Hard Knock Life" (from Annie)

Contestants' performances on the fifth live show
Contestant	Performance Pair	Order	Song	Result
Wieneke Remmers	Pair 1	1	"Dat zegt het hart (A Change in Me)"	Bottom 2
Anne Stalman	Pair 1	2	"Jij woont in mijn hart (You'll Be in My Heart)"	Bottom 2
Brigitte Heitzer	Pair 2	3	"A Piece of Sky"	Safe
Marjolein Teepen	Pair 2	4	"De man van La Mancha (Man of La Mancha)"	Safe
Marleen van der Loo	Pair 3	5	"Het Dorp"	Safe
Suzan Seegers	Pair 3	6	"Big Spender"	Safe

- Jury's favourite Evita:
  - Erwin van Lambaart: Marjolein (but also very positive about Suzan being his favourite)
  - Pia Douwes: Marjolein
  - Peter Van de Velde: Marjolein

Sing-Off

Act	Sing Off Song	Results
Wieneke Remmers	"Thuis (Home)" from The Wiz	Eliminated
Anne Stalman	"Thuis (Home)" from The Wiz	Saved by Nijholt

=== Week 6 (October 7, 2007) ===
In the quarter-final, the sixth Evita to be eliminated was Anne. The show performances were:

- Group performances:
  - "Shout" (Lulu)
  - "Foxtrot (Dutch version)" (from Foxtrot)

Contestants' performances on the sixth live show
Contestant	Order	First song	Order	Second song	Result
Brigitte Heitzer	1	"Al die jazz (All That Jazz)"	6	"Somebody to Love"	Safe
Marleen van der Loo	2	"Tegen alle verwachtingen in"	7	"Whatever Lola Wants"	Bottom 2
Suzan Seegers	3	"Ik ben een brassband (I'm a Brass Band)"	8	"Somewhere"	Safe
Marjolein Teepen	4	"Ik weet het nu (I Know the Truth)"	9	"Let Me Dance for You"	Safe
Anne Stalman	5	"Mannen (Men)"	10	"And I Am Telling You I'm Not Going"	Bottom 2

- Jury's favourite Evita:
  - Erwin van Lambaart: Marjolein
  - Pia Douwes: Marleen
  - Peter Van de Velde: Brigitte

Sing-Off

Act	Sing Off Song	Results
Marleen van der Loo	"De winnaar krijgt de macht (The Winner Takes It All)" from Mamma Mia	Saved by Nijholt
Anne Stalman	"De winnaar krijgt de macht (The Winner Takes It All)" from Mamma Mia	Eliminated

=== Week 7 (October 14, 2007) ===
In the semi-final, the seventh and final Evita to be eliminated was Marleen. The show performances were:

- Group performances:
  - "Dance: Ten; Looks: Three" (from A Chorus Line)
  - "Ik ben uitzonderlijk goed voor u (I'd Be Surprisingly Good For You)" featuring Roberto de Groot, who will play as Juan Perón in the upcoming Dutch revival of Evita

Contestants' performances on the seventh live show
Contestant	Order	First song	Order	Second song	Result
Marleen van der Loo	1	"Met één blik (With One Look)"	6	"Woman in the Moon"	Bottom 2
Suzan Seegers	2	"This Is My Life"	5	"Jij speelt een spel (Maybe I Like It This Way)"	Safe
Brigitte Heitzer	3	"Waar bleef die zomer? (Where Did That Summer Go?)"	8	"Proud Mary"	Safe
Marjolein Teepen	4	"Mein Herr"	7	"Astonishing"	Bottom 2

- Jury's favourite Evita:
  - Erwin van Lambaart: Suzan
  - Pia Douwes: Suzan
  - Peter Van de Velde: Brigitte

Sing-Off

Act	Sing Off Song	Results
Marleen van der Loo	"Één van ons (One of Us)" from Mamma Mia	Eliminated
Marjolein Teepen	"Één van ons (One of Us)" from Mamma Mia	Saved by Nijholt

=== Week 8 (October 21, 2007) ===
The grand finale saw Brigitte win the competition, with Suzan coming second and Marjolein third. The show performances were:

- Group performance:
  - Finalists and former Evitas: "There's No Business Like Show Business" (from Annie Get Your Gun)
  - Finalists: "One Night Only" (from Dreamgirls)
  - Brigitte and Suzan: "Buenos Aires (Dutch version)" (from Evita)
  - Brigitte and Suzan: "Huil niet om mij, Argentina (Don't Cry For Me, Argentina)" (from Evita)

Contestants' performances on the first live show
Contestant	Order	Song	Result
Marjolein Teepen	1	"Mijn leven is van mij (I Belong to Me)"	Eliminated
Brigitte Heitzer	2	"Het is over"	Winner
Suzan Seegers	3	"Een nieuw leven (A New Life)"	Runner-up

- Jury's verdict on who is Evita:
  - Erwin van Lambaart: could not choose between Suzan and Brigitte
  - Pia Douwes: could not choose between Suzan and Brigitte
  - Peter Van de Velde: Brigitte
  - Willem Nijholt: Suzan
- After being announced as the series winner, Brigitte concluded the series with a performance of "Huil niet om mij, Argentina (Don't Cry For Me, Argentina)".

== After the series ==
Brigitte Heitzer and several other finalists appeared in a special programme on 25 December 2008 with the winner and finalists from Op zoek naar Joseph titled Kerst met Joseph en Evita (Christmas with Joseph and Evita).

== Reception ==
=== Awards ===
On 1 October 2008, it was announced that Op zoek naar Evita was nominated for the Gouden Televizier-Ring 2008, for the best television from the season 2007–2008. On 24 October 2008 showed that this nomination was not silver, the Golden Televizier-Ring was won by Mooi! Weer De Leeuw.

== Follow-up ==
The success of the series lead to it becoming the first of a series of the Dutch themed talent contests produced by the AVRO in collaboration with Nijholt. 2008 saw Op zoek naar Joseph search for a new male lead to play Joseph for a production of Andrew Lloyd Webber's and Tim Rice's Joseph and the Amazing Technicolor Dreamcoat. This was followed in 2009 by Op zoek naar Mary Poppins, which searched for a new lead to play Mary Poppins in a production of the musical Mary Poppins. 2010 saw Op zoek naar Zorro cast Zorro in the forthcoming stage production of Zorro. Ten years later in 2021 saw Op zoek naar Maria cast Maria in the stage production of The Sound of Music. This was followed in 2022 by Op zoek naar Danny & Sandy, which searched for 2 new leads to play Danny & Sandy in a production of the musical Grease.
