= Richard Groenendijk =

Dutch cabaret artist, actor and voice actor

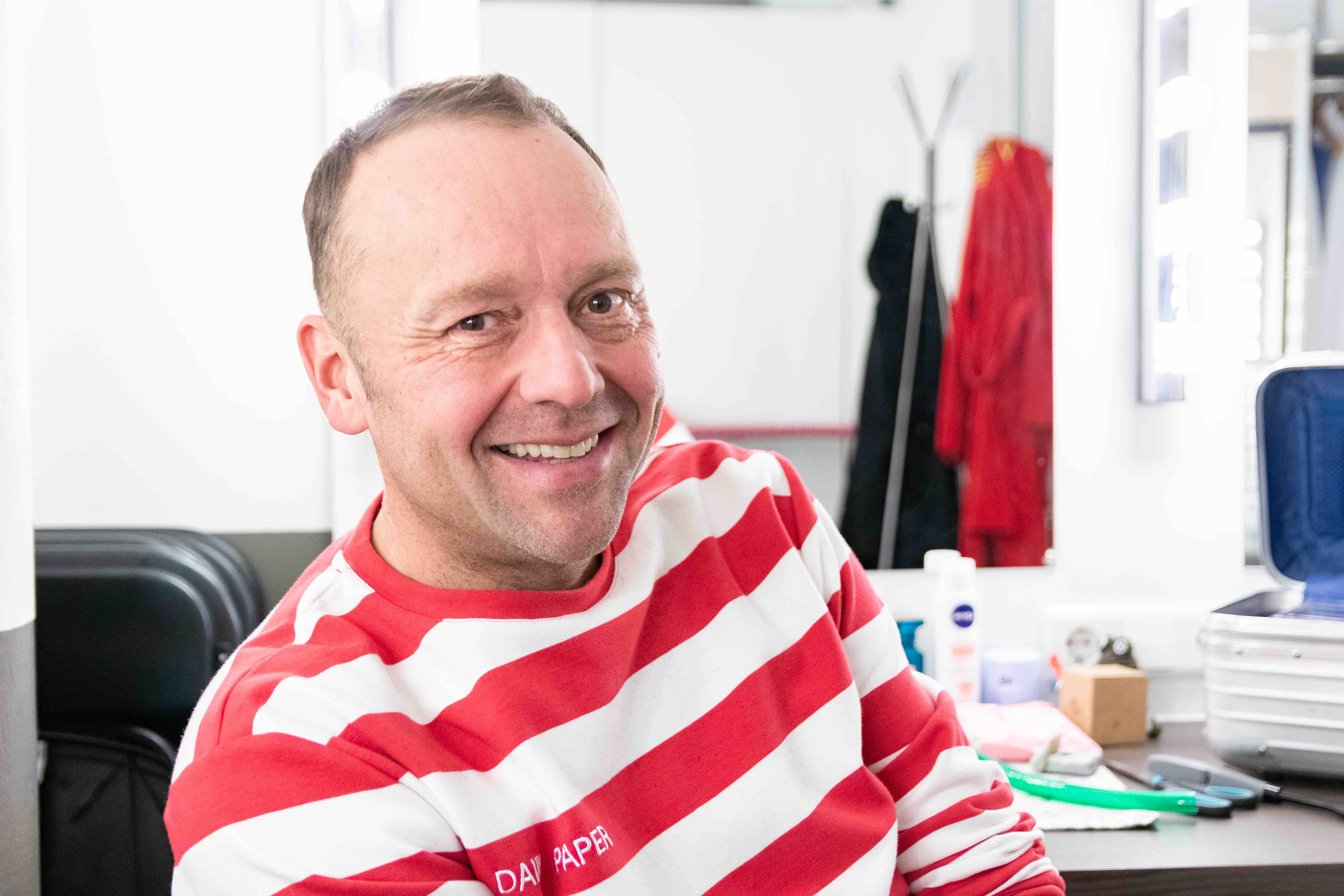
- Born: 1972 (age 53–54); Dirksland, Netherlands
- Occupations: Cabaret artist; Actor; Television presenter

Richard Groenendijk (born 1972) is a Dutch cabaret artist, actor and voice actor. He won the Poelifinario cabaret award multiple times for his theatre shows. He also presented the television shows Terrazzo, Think Inside the Box and De Jopie Parlevliet Show. Groenendijk has played roles in television series and films and he also voiced multiple characters in films.

== Career ==
=== Cabaret ===
Groenendijk reached the final at the 1995 Cameretten cabaret festival. In 2012, he won the Poelifinario award for the theatre show Alle Dagen.

In 2022, he was nominated for the Annie M.G. Schmidtprijs for the song Ik hoop het wel. The song is written by Jan Beuving and Groenendijk performs the song in his theatre show Voor iedereen beter. An adapted version of the song was used that year by the Rotterdam-based organisation Stichting Humanitas as part of a campaign about prejudice and bullying against LGBTQ+ seniors. Groenendijk won the Poelifinario award in the category Entertainment for the show Voor iedereen beter.

He won the 'best male lead in a major musical' award at the 2026 Musical Awards for his role as Edna Turnblad in the Hairspray musical.

=== Television ===
Groenendijk and cabaret artist Mylène d'Anjou presented the television show Terrazzo (KRO). He was one of the team captains in the 2013 season of the game show Wie ben ik? presented by Wendy van Dijk. In the show, contestants in two teams are assigned a name or an object and they need to guess who or what they are by asking questions.

In 2015 and 2016, he presented the talk show De Jopie Parlevliet Show as his alter ego Jopie Parlevliet, a diva from Rotterdam. The show ended as the channel (RTL 4) did not consider the age profile of the viewers to be a good fit for the channel anymore, despite improved viewing figures in the second season. He played a role in the first season of the 2017 drama television series De 12 van Oldenheim. The show premiered on Videoland and aired a year later on RTL 4. He presented the 2017 documentary 100 jaar Sonneveld about the life of Dutch cabaret artist and singer Wim Sonneveld. Groenendijk was a panel member in multiple seasons of the show Ranking the Stars presented by Paul de Leeuw, a show in which celebrities rank each other.

In 2020, he presented the quiz show Hard spel, an adaptation of the Australian show Hard Quiz. He was one of the judges in the 2021 talent competition show Op zoek naar Maria, a show to find a musical theatre performer to play the role of Maria von Trapp in the musical The Sound of Music. From May to June 2022, he presented the game show Think Inside the Box in which contestants have to guess what is inside a large box. The show drew disappointing viewing figures and the show was cancelled in June 2022.

Groenendijk succeeded Leo Alkemade as team captain in the game show Ik hou van Holland in 2023.

=== Film ===
Groenendijk plays a small role in the 2008 film Sinterklaas en het Geheim van het Grote Boek directed by Martijn van Nellestijn. He plays a role in the 2022 film De Grote Sinterklaasfilm: Gespuis in de Speelgoedkluis directed by Lucio Messercola. He also plays a role in the 2022 film Casa Coco directed by Bob Wilbers and in the 2022 film Ome Cor directed by Peter Verhage and Martin van Waardenberg. He plays a small role in the film Almost Cops (Dutch title: Bad Boa's) which premiered in July 2025 on Netflix.

=== Podcast ===
Since June 2025, Groenendijk and stylist Fred van Leer host the podcast Fred en Ries. The podcast won the audience award at the 2025 Dutch Podcast Awards.

=== Voice acting ===
Groenendijk provided the Dutch voice for characters in multiple films, including Inside Out (2015), Finding Dory (2016) and Ralph Breaks the Internet (2018). He voiced a character in the films Sing (2016) and Sing 2 (2021). He also voiced a character in Inside Out 2 (2024).

=== Singing ===
In November 2020, Groenendijk released the single Tebbie nou op je muil? as his alter ego Jopie Parlevliet, a diva from Rotterdam. The song is about the COVID-19 pandemic in the Netherlands.

=== Other activities ===
In 2015, he won the Gouden Mossel award, an award given to people who have made a difference for the city of Rotterdam. In 2023, he received the Jillis Bruggeman Penning award, an award given to people or organisations that have made contributions to gender diversity and people of different genders.

Groenendijk was one of the performers in a 2018 theatre show dedicated to the Dutch singer Robert Long. He played the role of Pontius Pilate in The Passion 2025, a Dutch Passion Play held every Maundy Thursday since 2011.

=== Television appearances ===
Groenendijk was a contestant in the 2006 season of the television show Wie is de Mol?. He was also a contestant in the 2025 anniversary season of the show. Groenendijk was a contestant in the 2020–2021 New Year's Special of the television series The Masked Singer. He was also a contestant in the 2024–2025 New Year's Special of the television series Make Up Your Mind. He appeared as the drag queen Bette Gourmette in the show. In 2025, he was a guest in an episode of the show De reünie presented by Herman van der Zandt. He was also a guest in an episode of the television show Dit was het nieuws. In 2026, he was a guest jury member in an episode of the show Stars on Stage, a show in which contestants compete to become a musical theatre performer.

== Personal life ==
Groenendijk was born in Dirksland, Netherlands, a village located on the island Goeree-Overflakkee. He later moved to Rotterdam.

Groenendijk and his partner married in July 2019.

== Awards ==
- Poelifinario (2012, for his show Alle Dagen)
- Gouden Mossel (2015)
- Poelifinario (2022, for his show Voor iedereen beter)
- Jillis Bruggeman Penning (2023)
- Best male lead in a major musical (2026 Musical Awards, for his role as Edna Turnblad in the Hairspray musical)

== Selected filmography ==
=== As presenter ===
- Terrazzo
- De Jopie Parlevliet Show (2015–2016)
- 100 jaar Sonneveld (2017)
- Hard spel (2020)
- Think Inside the Box (2022)

=== As actor (television) ===
- De 12 van Oldenheim (2017, Videoland)

=== As actor (film) ===
- Sinterklaas en het Geheim van het Grote Boek (2008)
- De Grote Sinterklaasfilm: Gespuis in de Speelgoedkluis (2022)
- Casa Coco (2022)
- Ome Cor (2022)
- Almost Cops (2025, Netflix, Dutch title: Bad Boa's)

=== As team captain ===
- Wie ben ik? (2013)
- Ik hou van Holland (2023–2024)

=== As judge ===
- Op zoek naar Maria (2021)

=== As panel member ===
- Ranking the Stars

=== As contestant ===
- Wie is de Mol? (2006)
- The Masked Singer (2020)
- Make Up Your Mind (2024)
- Wie is de Mol? (2025, anniversary season)
- Dit was het nieuws (2025)

=== As himself ===
- De reünie (2025)

== Discography ==
- Tebbie nou op je muil? (2020, single)
