= Koefnoen =

Dutch television show

Koefnoen (say: koof noon) was a popular Dutch television show, aired by the AVRO between 2004 and 2016. The first episode aired on 17 September 2004. The sketches on this show were taking a look at the past week.

Most characters in Koefnoen were done by Dutch comedians Owen Schumacher and Paul Groot. A few other comedians supported them in the show. A lot of these comedians previously worked for Kopspijkers, another Dutch television show.

'Koefnoen' is a Dutch-Yiddish word and means "for free". The word comes from 'kuf' and 'nun', the names of two Hebrew letters, equal to 'K' and 'N' which are the first letters of the words "Kost Niks", Dutch for "costs nothing".
