= Karin Bloemen =

Dutch actress and singer

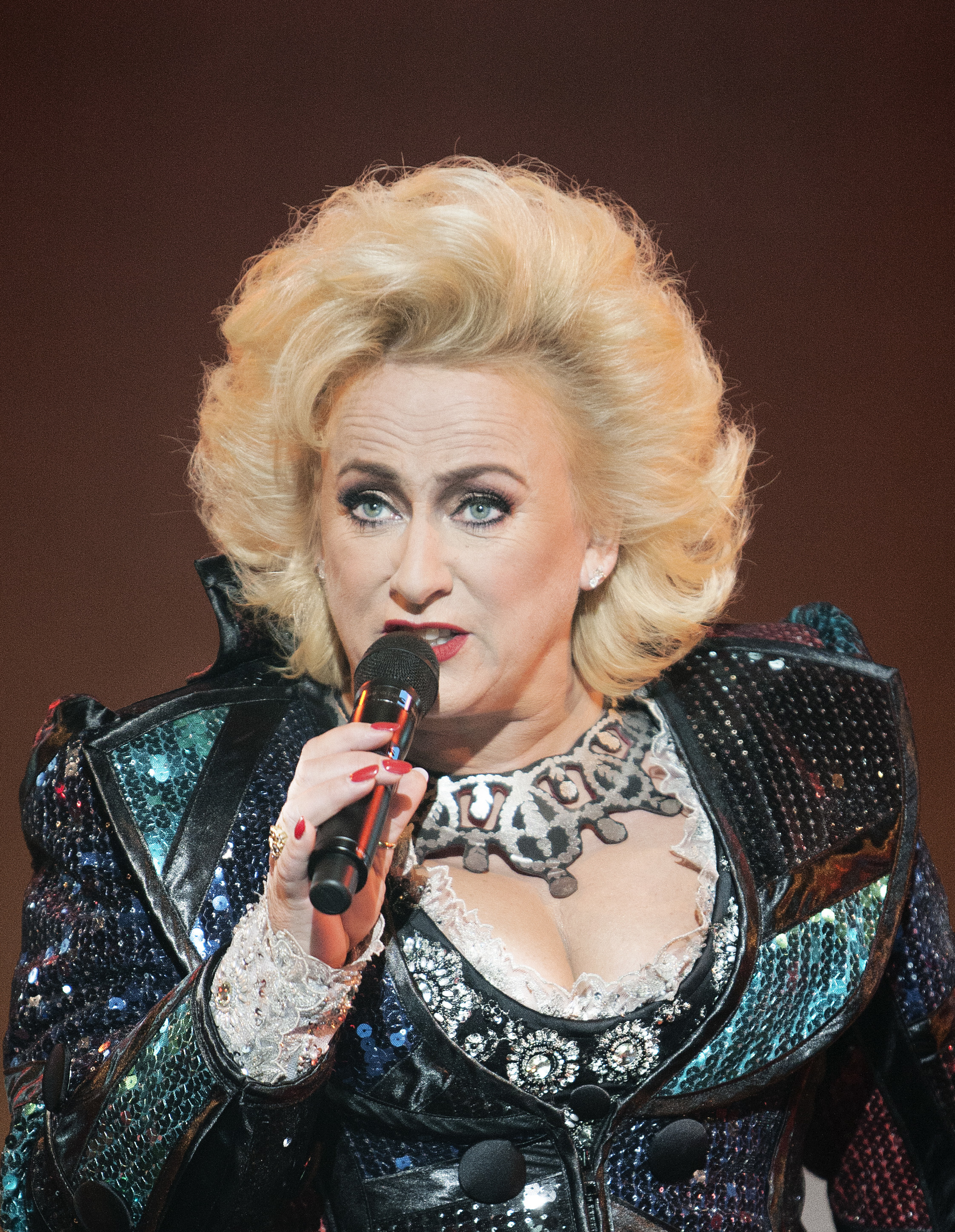
- Karin Bloemen in 2014

Background information
- Born: 28 June 1960 (age 66); Alkmaar, Netherlands
- Origin: Netherlands
- Years active: 1983–present
- Website: http://www.labloemen.nl

Karin Bloemen is a Dutch actress and singer known for her appearances in various films and television shows in the Netherlands. Since 1983, she has been a singer and cabaret artist.

Before she had even finished her study at the Academy of Arts in Amsterdam in 1984, she won several prizes. She was awarded the Pisuisse Prize, which is an award for the student with the best theatre performance within the Academy. After graduation, the Pall Mall Export Prize quickly followed this prize. This is a prize for the promotion and development of young artists.

Bloemen soon became a well-known singer and actress in several Dutch musicals, films, television and radio programs. Her 1984 anti-apartheid song Zuid-Afrika was written by Jeroen van Merwijk. In 1994 she performed it in front of Nelson Mandela.

Within six years of graduating, she made her debut in her first theatre show- Bosje Bloemen (Bunch of Flowers). This was the first show in a series of successful gigs including:

- Karin in Concert
- La Flowers
- Everything ... La on Tour
- Late Nights
- Chameleon
- The Diva and the Divan
- Various Christmas shows
- Her 25-year Jubilee Show
- Absobloodylutely Bloemiliciously Fanf*ckintastic. 2011–2012
- Purper 5
- Purper Gala
- Niet Gesnoeid
- Six late Nights
- La Bloemen's Licht-In-Donkere-Dagen Kerst-Bal 2002/2004
- La Bloemens Kerst Show 2005/2006
- Beter Laat
- Overgang
- Witte Nar
- Kerst met een grote K (2014)
- Volle bloei (2017)
- Souvenirs (2019)

The VARA has televised many of her theatre shows and these have been released on DVDs

== Personal life ==
Bloemen's parents separated when she was 3 years old. She was forbidden to have any contact with her father. La Bloemen was an incest victim.

She mentors her nephew after his mother Annelies (Bloemen's sister) died in a fire in 1989. Another sister Inge died of epilepsy in February 2014.

She has talked openly about her own pregnancy, her burnout and her weight issue which she has been addressed. She is married to guitarist Marnix Busstra and they have two daughters.

Bloemen is an active supporter of organizations that fight poverty and sexual abuse.

She is well known as a gay icon.

The proceeds of one of her recordings was donated to mother-and-child health projects in Asia, notably Bangladesh.

In 2005 she won a court case against a Dutch magazine for publishing private photographs of her family without permission.

Since April 2016 she has a new manager: Mike Dobbinga.

== Accolades ==
Karen has been honored in the course of her career with:

- 1983: Pisuisse Prize
- 1984: Pall Mall Export prize
- 1994: Golden Harp
- Edison Prize category cabaret
- 1996: The Annie MG Schmidt Prize for her interpretation of the song Geen kind meer, lyrics by Jan Boerstoel, music by Marnix Busstra
- In April 2011 Bloemen became an Officer in the Order of Oranje-Nassau.

== Discography ==
Album	Tracks A	Tracks B
Karin in concert: 1993; Karin In Concert (CD, Album) Ariola, Bertelsmann Music Group 74321 173602 Netherlands; Karin In Concert (22xFile, AAC, Album, RE, 256) Ariola	1 Proloog 4:29; 2 Everybody 2:08; 3 Introduktie Woman in the moon 1:19; 4 Woman in the moon 4:21; 5 Arthur 3:38; 6 Introduktie You were my friend 1:44; 7 You were my friend 3:34; 8 Russin 1:55; 9 Russisch Carnaval 3:10; 10 Holland 3:05	11 This is my life 3:51; 12 Introduktie Motown-medley 3:20; 13 Motown-medley 3:00; 14 Introduktie Almaz 2:26; 15 Almaz 3:32; 16 Les Misabel 7:42; 17 Liefde 5:36; 18 Tegen alle verwachtingen in 3:38; 19 Introduktie Zuid-Afrika 0:40; 20 Zuid-Afrika 4:30; 21 I'm Changing 4:01; 22 Everybody (reprise) 1:31
La Bloemen: 1994; BMG Ariola – 74321 236072	1 Ouverture 2:11; 2 Let's Go Crazy 3:35; 3 Limburgse Prinses 4:58; 4 She's Too Fat 2:13; 5 Signed, Sealed, Delivered 2:41; 6 Duitse Prinses 3:54; 7 I Who Have Nothing 3:53; 8 When a Man Loves a Woman 4:32; 9 Op een wolk 2:47; 10 Wee B Dooin' It 2:30; 11 Rotterdamse Prinses 3:32; 12 Jungle Grunch 1:08; 13 Sweet In the Morning 2:11; 14 Free Your Mind 3:56; 15 Er is geen andere kant 3:53; 16 Je ne regrette rien 4:45	1 Meloen 10:17; 2 If I Ever Fall In Love 4:45; 3 Gooise Prinses 3:57; 4 Nooit meer een prins voor mij 1:08; 5 Soul with a Capital S 4:45; 6 Wie een kuil graaft 3:49; 7 Everything Must Change 5:44; 8 Duetten 5:35; 9 Pas toen ik 2:35; 10 Say Yes, Say No 3:52; 11 I'm Telling You 6:39
Live at Paradiso: 1995; Dino Music – 7243 5606842 1; CD, Album; Netherlands	1 Slave To The Rhythm / Fame; 2 Queen Of The Night; 3 Endangered Species; 4 I Can't Make You Love Me; 5 Another Part Of Me; 6 Satisfaction	7 Angie; 8 They Don't Care About Us; 9 What Have You Done For Me Lately; 10 Don't Stop Me Now; 11 With A Little Help
La on tour: 1996; LA On Tour (CD, Album) VARAgram VCD 485498 2 Netherlands; LA On Tour (18xFile, AAC, Album, RE, 256) VARAgram n	1 Beeld Alleen 2:56; 2 Freedom 4:14; 3 Ik Wil Macht 3:07; 4 Mijn Orgaan 4:43; 5 Crazy 4:24; 6 Hoor Ik Mezelf Zingen 1:14; 7 Een Klein Stukkie 5:48; 8 Schaduw Je Schaduw 1:31; 9 Sonnet 24 4:10	10 Komt De Dood Om Mij 3:40; 11 Mama 4:05; 12 Spread Love 3:03; 13 I Ain't Gonna Let You Break My Heart Again 3:14; 14 Love Child 3:57; 15 Beeld Alleen II 1:17; 16 Geen Kind Meer 3:07; 17 I've Got To Sing My Song 5:27; 18 Shining Star 4:27
Kameleon: 1998; Kameleon (CD) Sony Music EPC 491757 2 Netherlands; Kameleon (CD, Album) Sony Music Entertainment (Holland) B.V. EPC 491757 9 Netherlands; Kameleon (12xFile, AAC, Album, RE, 256) La Bloemen Productions b.v. Benelux	1 Ik Weet 2:48; 2 Alles Wat Komt 4:10; 3 Nooit Meer Jong 4:20; 4 Kameleon 4:28; 5 Ben Ik Je Kwijt 4:26; 6 De Nacht 2:52	7 Hoeveel Heb Je Nodig 5:16; 8 Vliegen 3:18; 9 Kind, Nog Zonder Gezicht 4:16; 10 Voor Jou 4:23; 11 Laat Me 4:49; 12 Geen Kind Meer 4:23
Het zou toch moeten bestaan: 2002; Het Zou Toch Moeten Bestaan (CD, Album) Turtle Records (3) TRSA 0014 Netherlands; Het Zou Toch Moeten Bestaan (13xFile, AAC, Album, RE, 256) Turtle Records (3)	1 Wat Voorbij Is 3:19; 2 Een Dokter Met Een Bril 3:45; 3 Vorig Land 4:14; 4 Het Zou Toch Moeten Bestaan 5:16; 5 One For My Baby (And One More For The Road) 4:22; 6 Het Dorp 4:48; 7 Visioen 4:19	8 Enfin 3:52; 9 Het Lied Van Een Moeder 3:34; 10 Lef 4:16; 11 Köln Am Rhein 3:37; 12 Nuttelozen Van De Nacht 4:44; 13 God Bless The Child 6:19
Weet je nog ?: 2005; Weet Je Nog? (2xCD, Album, Ltd) Princess Records (2) PEG 5006 Netherlands; Weet Je Nog? (CD, Album) La Bloemen Productions b.v. 7300040 Netherlands; Weet Je Nog? (13xFile, AAC, Album, RE, 256) La Bloemen Productions b.v.	1 Weet Je Nog? 4:29; 2 Almaz 5:10; 3 Er Is Geen Andere Kant 3:36; 4 Zuid-Afrika 4:08; 5 Lef 5:15; 6 Holland 3:16; 7 Als Ik Mijn Vader Was 1:54; 8 Pas Toen Ik 3:46	9 Ik Wil Jou 4:15; 10 Tegen Alle Verwachtingen In 4:28; 11 Een Klein Stukkie 5:51; 12 Op Een Wolk 2:04; 13 Mama 4:10; 14 Telkens Weer - Live 4:53; 15 Geen Kind Meer 4:25
Bloemen zingt / sings Streisand: 2006; Princess Entertainment, Brigadoon Vocal PEG 6010 Netherlands; (2xCD, Album)	1 Somewhere 3:20; 2 The Way He Makes Me Feel 3:22; 3 Yesterdays 3:06; 4 Everybody Says Don't 2:24; 5 My Man 3:39; 6 People 5:28; 7 On A Clear Day You Can See Forever 3:23; 8 Gotta Move 2:16; 9 Queen Bee 3:51; 10 Evergreen 3:23; 11 Send In The Clowns 4:02; 12 The Way We Were 3:20; Bonus Track: 13 The Minute Waltz 2:18	14 Later 3:20; 15 Wat Ik Voor Je Voel 3:22; 16 In Die Tijd 3:06; 17 Waarom Zeggen Ze 'Nee'? 2:25; 18 Mij Man 3:39; 19 Vriendschap 5:28; 2O Een Morgen 3:23; 21 Dan Maar Niet! 2:16; 22 De Bijen-Bea 3:43; 23 Eeuwige Liefde 3:23; 24 Lach Het Maar Weg 4:02; 25 Wat Voorbij Is 3:21; Bonus Track: 26 De Minutenwals 2:18
Muse: 06–10–2007; Muse (CD, Album) La Bloemen Productions b.v., Princess Entertainment PEG 7005 Netherlands; Muse (12xFile, AAC, Album, RE, 256) La Bloemen Productions b.v., Princess Entertainment	1 Coming Morning Heartache 5:15; 2 How Insensitive 3:43; 3 Every Time We Say Goodbye 4:21; 4 Love For Sale 4:53; 5 Loverman 3:18; 6 Early Autumn 4:24	7 In A Sentimental Mood 4:01; 8 They Can't Take That Away From Me 2:48; 9 One Note Samba 2:39; 10 Night And Day 4:27; 11 Let's Do It 4:28; 12 The Man I Love 4:00
Verstreken verzen: 23–04–2010; La Baleine records	1 Huilen is voor jou te laat 3:16; 2 Ritme van de regen 2:50; 3 Het dorp 4;34; 4 Opzij 2:34; 5 Avond 4:08; 6 Over de muur 3:23; 7 Het lachen dat we samen deden 5:44	8 Het kleine café aan de haven 3:47; 9 Liefde van later 4:36; 10 Is dit alles? 3:21; 11 Als je overmorgen oud bent 3:51; 12 Geen kind meer 4:11; 13 Koffie 3:35
Licht: 2010; Licht (CD, Album) La Bloemen Productions b.v. LBP 1002 Netherlands; Licht (15xFile, AAC, Album, 256) La Bloemen Productions b.v.	1 Blijf Dicht Bij Mij 3:47; 2 Thuis 3:06; 3 Ik Hoop 2:34; 4 De Mooiste Roos 3:16; 5 Volg Me Naar Later 2:50; 6 Dans Me Naar Morgen 3:15; 7 De Hond 3:21; 8 Ik Ben Niet Meer Bang 2:24	9 De Sneeuw 2:22; 10 Jij Krijgt Van Mij 3:00; 11 Kan Ik Ooit 2:48; 12 Wees Niet Bang 2:57; 13 Eigen Kracht 2:11; 14 Jij Bent Mijn Steun 2:19; 15 Dit Is 'T Moment 4:07
Het dorp: 1999; CD single	*1 Het Dorp	2 Aan de Amsterdamse grachten
Als je iets kan doen: 2005; Memisa Cordaid; Recorded At – D.E.M.P. Studio's; The proceeds of this CD are for mother-and-child health projects in Asia, especially for Bangladesh	Als Je Iets Kan Doen 4:42; with Edsilia Rombley	Er Is Geen Andere Kant
Wereldwijd orkest: 2011		
Diva's Van Carré: 2014; Diva's Van Carré (15xFile, AAC, Album, 256) La Bloemen Productions b.v.; Diva's Van Carré (CD, Album) La Bloemen Productions b.v. LBP 1005 Netherlands	1 Pensieri 2:09; 2 Het Leven Van Een Diva 3:31; 3 Meisje Uit De Provincie 3:59; 4 Lili Marleen (ch Bin Von Kopf Bis Fuss) 1:42; 5 Zeur Niet 2:17; 6 Zeik Niet 1:16; 7 Appels Op De Tafelsprei 3:54; 8 Mr. Bojangles 4:27	9 Liefde Van Later 4:14; 10 Musical Medley 8:01; 11 The Rose 3:26; 12 Amsterdam Medley 3:06; 13 Something 3:06; 14 Send In The Clowns 4:41; 15 One For My Baby 4:19
Witte Nar: 2015; Witte Nar (10xFile, AAC, Album, 256) La Bloemen Productions b.v.; Witte Nar (CD, Album) La Bloemen Productions b.v. LBP 1007 Netherlands	1 Waar Wacht Je Op 5:22; 2 Back To Black 4:44; 3 De Nar 5:37; 4 Je Wist Natuurlijk 4:20; 5 Feel Good 2:56	6 The Same 4:51; 7 Amsterdam Gaat Dood 4:08; 8 Soon As I Get Home 5:20; 9 Hand In My Pocket 4:02; 10 Be The Song 5:19
Zuid-Africa: 1993; Ariola – 74321 176552, BMG – 74321 176552; CD, Single; Netherlands	1 Zuid-Afrika 4:02; 2 Introduktie Motown Medley 3:22; 3 Motown Medley 2:54	
Geen Kind Meer: 1996; VARAgram – VCD 6639131; CD, Single; Netherlands	1 Geen Kind Meer 4:02	2 Mama 4:05
Ik Ben Verraden: 2011; Ik Ben Verraden (CD, Single) La Bloemen Productions b.v. LBP 1003 Netherlands; Ik Ben Verraden (CDr) La Bloemen Productions b.v. LBP1003 Netherlands; Ik Ben Verraden (File, AAC, Single, 256) La Bloemen Productions b.v.	1 Ben Verraden 4:59	
Because It's Christmas: 26–11–2014; La Bloemen Productions b.v.; File, AAC, Single, 256 kbit/s	Because It's Christmas 3:17	
Amsterdam Gaat Dood: 21–03–2014; La Bloemen Productions b.v.; File, AAC, Single, 256 kbit/s	Amsterdam Gaat Dood 4:02	
Over De Muur: 2010; CDr, Promo; Netherlands	Over De Muur	

=== DVD ===
Album	1	2
25 jaar jubileumshow : Live in Carré: 2008 Jubilee show recorded in Carré in Amsterdam; Dolby 2.0 Stereo; DVD region 2 (Europe, Netherlands); TV standard: PALK color	1 Love in your eyes; 2 This is my life; 3 Jubileum; 4 De kat op het plat; Je dochter kan een parel zijn; Officier van justitie [medley]; 5 The making of my way 1; 6 Zusjes; 7 Apartheid es ien skone zaak; 8 Je ne regrette rien; 9 De nacht; 10 Assepoester; 11 The making of my way 2; 12 Medley Motown; 13 Almaz; 14 I'm changing; 15 Weet je nog	16 Gezelligheid kent wel tijd; 17 Het dorp; 18 Ik begrijp niets daarvan; 19 Free your mind; 20 Mijn orgaan; 21 The making of my way 3; 22 Conny's comments on a career; 23 Love child; 24 Geen kind meer; 25 Oud bruin 1; 26 Guilty; 27 Oud bruin 2; 28 Kameleon; 29 My way; 30 Sing my song
Overgang: 18 januari 2010; Dolby Digital 2.0 Stereo	1 Tent 1; 2 Krekels; 3 Voicemail 1; 4 I got rhythm; 5 De pop; 6 Je bent alleen; 7 Droom 1; 8 Gang en legukkig; 9 Voicemail 2; 10 Tent 2; 11 Fame 1; 12 Vulkanen van as; 13 Fame 2	14 Droom 2; 15 Bij Oprah; 16 Diva; 17 In de hoofdrol; 18 Ma fille; 19 Voicemail 3; 20 Lang leve de overgang; 21 Tent 3; 22 Zaklantaarn; 23 Droom 3; 24 Wie wil die leeft voor eeuwig; 25 Jong van geest; 26 Forever young
De diva & de divan (2): January 2008; With Cor Bakker; 2 DVD-video's; Dolby 2.0 Stereo; Dolby 5.0/5.1; DVD Region 0 (incl. Netherlands); TV PAL Color	1 Visioen; 2 Nevel; 3 Het zou toch moeten bestaan; 4 Als ik het niet doe; 5 Lied van een moeder; 6 Eerste vleugel; 7 Ik; 8 Grüss gotti; 9 Tweede vleugel; 10 Derde vleugel; 11 Tarzan; 12 Everybody says don't; 13 Niet gezellig	14 Lef; 15 Gezelligheid kent wel tijd; 16 Het dorp; 17 Queen Bee; 18 Ik begrijp niets daarvan; 19 Nuttelozen van de nacht; 20 De grot; 21 Vierde vleugel; 22 Een dokter met een bril; 23 De hoge; 24 Wat voorbij is; 25 One for my baby
