= AVRO =

Former Dutch public broadcasting association

Algemene Vereniging Radio Omroep
- Branding: AVRO
- Country: Netherlands
- Availability: Nationwide
- Licence area: Netherlands
- Headquarters: Hilversum, Netherlands
- Broadcast area: Netherlands
- Established: 8 July 1923
- Launch date: 1923 (first broadcast of NSF); 1927 (foundation of AVRO)
- Dissolved: 7 September 2014
- Former names: Hilversumsche Draadlooze Omroep (1923-1927); Algemeene Nederlandsche Radio Omroep and Nederlandsche Omroep Vereeniging (1927)
- Official website: avro.nl
- Replaced by: AVROTROS

AVRO, short for Algemene Vereniging Radio Omroep ("General Association of Radio Broadcasting"), was a Dutch public broadcasting association operating within the framework of the Nederlandse Publieke Omroep system. It was the first public broadcaster in the Netherlands. In 2014 AVRO merged with fellow broadcaster TROS to form AVROTROS.

== History ==
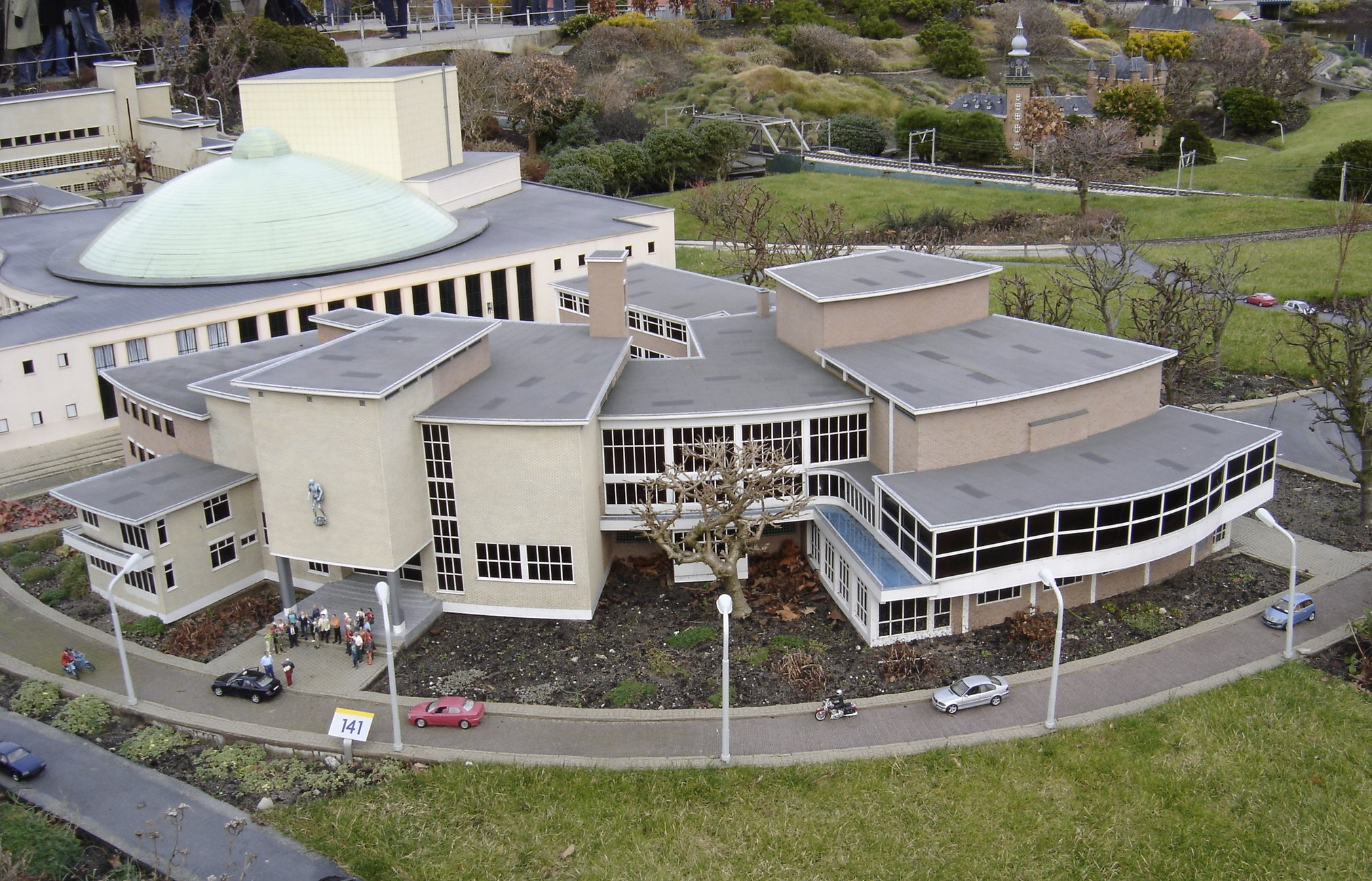
A model of AVRO Studios in the miniature park Madurodam

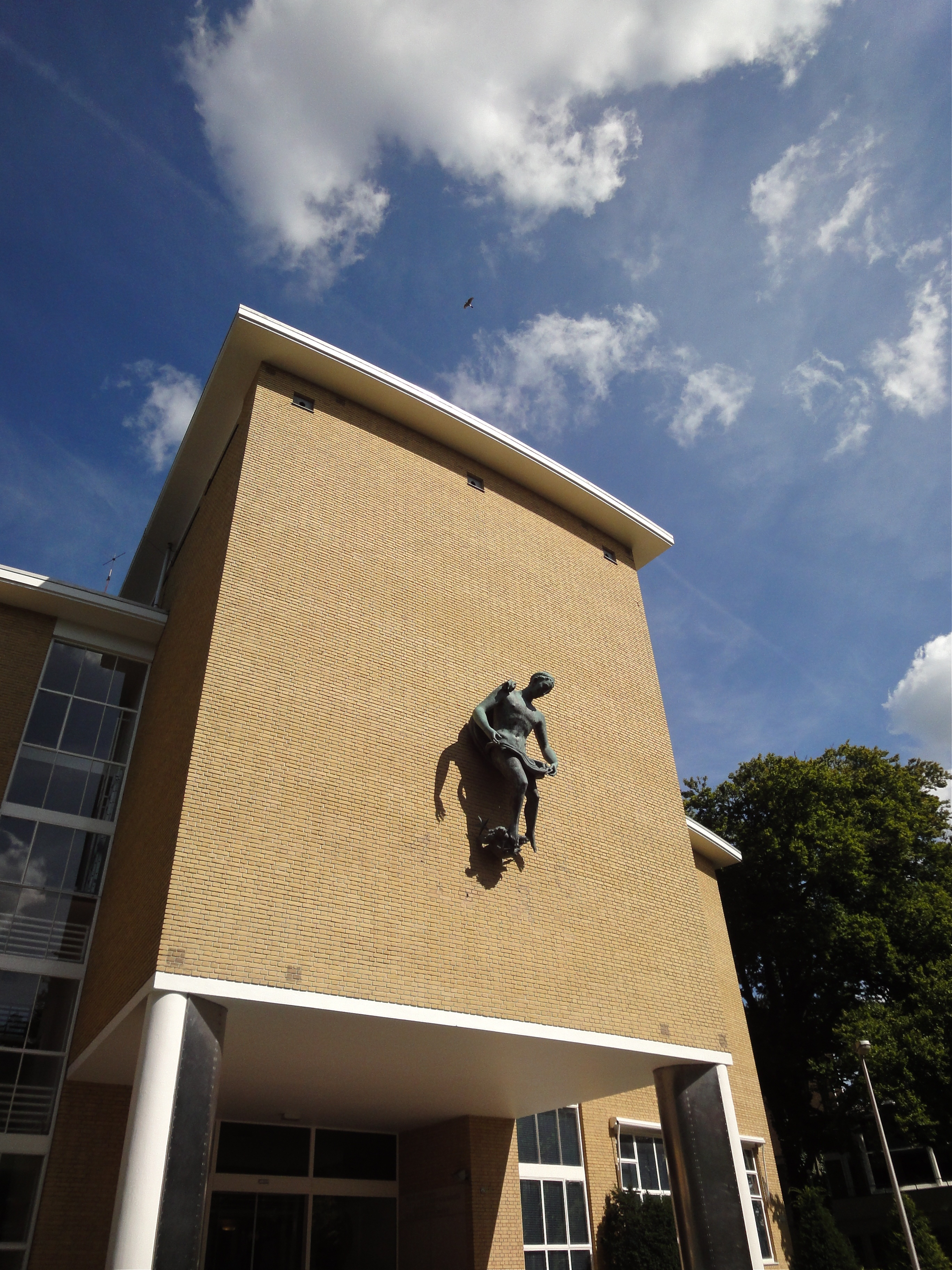
The main entrance of the studios

On 8 July 1923, Hilversumsche Draadlooze Omroep was launched by the Nederlandsche Seintoestellen Fabriek (in English: Dutch Transmitter Factory) under supervision of Willem Vogt. On 21 July 1923, it provided the first regular radio broadcast in the Netherlands. In 1927 it changed its name into Algemeene Nederlandsche Radio Omroep (ANRO), followed soon by a merger with Nederlandsche Omroep Vereeniging (NOV). On 28 December 1927, the two merged broadcasters continued as Algemeene Vereeniging Radio Omroep (A.V.R.O., in English: "General Association of Radio Broadcasting").

In 1938, AVRO sponsored what was the strongest chess tournament ever to be held, won by Paul Keres on a tiebreak over Reuben Fine.

AVRO was historically associated with the liberal pillar, a fact reflected in its longtime slogan, "promoting freedom."

In 1971, AVRO was the broadcasting association that had the largest number of members, being one of the four A-rated associations.

On 2 September 1999, AVRO adopted its fourth and last logo, consisting of the "Avro" wordmark made up of blue stripes, except the letter "o" made up of a blue ball.

On 7 September 2014, AVRO merged with its fellow broadcaster TROS to create one company known as AVROTROS.

== Radio channels ==
Under NPO Radio 4:

- AVRO Back to the Old School
- AVRO Baroque around the Clock (shut down 1 April 2016)
- AVRO Easy Listening
- AVRO Klassiek
- AVRO Het beste van het beste
- AVRO Radio Festival Classique
- AVRO Steenen Tijdperk Fifties
- AVRO Steenen Tijdperk Sixties
- AVRO Ziel en Zaligheid
- AVRO Operette

== Radio programmes ==
- Arbeidsvitaminen

== Television programmes ==
- Devil's Advocate
- EénVandaag (co-production with TROS)
- Gehaktdag
- Koefnoen
- Op zoek naar Evita
- Op zoek naar Joseph
- The Phone
- TopPop
- Wie is de Mol? (Dutch version of The Mole)

== Logos ==
1963–1977

1977–1999

1999–2014

== Presenters ==
- Chantal Janzen (TV)
- Cornald Maas (TV)
- Gerard Ekdom (TV and radio)
- Jan Steeman (Radio)
- Pia Dijkstra (TV and radio)
- Sipke Jan Bousema (TV)

== Announcers ==
- Netty Rosenfeld† (1951–1952)
- Heleen van Meurs (1953–1955)
- Mies Bouwman (1954–1955)
- Ageeth Scherphuis (1956–1966)
- Elizabeth Mooy (1959–1966, 1971–1976)
- Ilse Wessel † (1963–1969)
- Lonneke Hoogland (1964–1968)
- Ria Bremer (1966–1970)
- Viola Holt/Viola van Emmenes (1968–1969)
- Alice Oppenheim (1968–1975)
- Sonja van Proosdij (1969)
- Lous Haasdijk † (1969–1975)
- Ingrid Drissen (1974–1980)
- Jos van Vliet (1975–1976)
- Hans van der Togt (1976–1989)
- Ilona Hofstra (1977–1979)
- Patricia Messer (1979–1985)
- Jack van der Voorn (1983)
- Monique van der Sande (1983–1985)
- Ad Visser (1985–1989)
- Myrna Goossen (1985–1990)
- Simon Visser (1986)
- Roeland Kooijmans (1988–1991)
- Birgit E. Gantzert (1989–1992)
- Judith de Bruijn (1989–1992)
- Pauline Dekker (1990–1991)
- Humberto Tan (1991–1992)

== Correspondents ==
- Link van Bruggen †
- Jan Brusse † (1948–1985)
- Koen Corver
- Anton Foek
- Albert Milhado † (1945–1975)
- Peter Schröder † (1960–1984)
- Max Tak † (1945–1967)
- Fons van Westerloo (1976–1983)
