= The Wizard of Oz (disambiguation) =

The Wizard of Oz is a 1939 musical film starring Judy Garland, based on the L. Frank Baum novel.

The Wizard of Oz also commonly refers to:

- The Wonderful Wizard of Oz, the 1900 L. Frank Baum novel sometimes reprinted as The Wizard of Oz
- Wizard of Oz (character) from the series of Baum novels and subsequent adaptations
- The Wizard of Oz (soundtrack) from the 1939 MGM musical film, first released in 1956
- The Wizard of Oz (1939 album), studio recording of songs from the film, with Garland vocals on two tracks
- The Wizard of Oz at Sphere, a 2025 immersive 4D version of the 1939 MGM musical film created to screen at Sphere in the Las Vegas Valley

The Wizard of Oz may also refer to:

== Adaptations of the novel ==
- Adaptations of The Wonderful Wizard of Oz

=== Film ===
- The Wizard of Oz (1925 film), an American silent film directed by Larry Semon
- The Wizard of Oz (1933 film), a Canadian animated short directed by Ted Eshbaugh
- The Wizard of Oz (1982 film), an anime feature film from Japan

=== Television and video ===
- The Wizard of Oz (1950 film), a half-hour television adaptation
- The Wizard of Oz (TV series), a 1990 American animated series

=== Musicals and concerts ===
- The Wizard of Oz (1902 musical), by L. Frank Baum, Paul Tietjens and others
- The Wizard of Oz (1942 musical), commissioned by the St. Louis Municipal Opera
- The Wizard of Oz (1987 musical), adapted by the Royal Shakespeare Company
  - The Wizard of Oz (2001 album), Australian cast recording of the stage musical production
- The Wizard of Oz in Concert: Dreams Come True, a 1995 musical performance
- The Wizard of Oz, a 2004 musical directed by David Fleeshman
- The Wizard of Oz (2011 musical), by Andrew Lloyd Webber and Tim Rice

=== Gaming ===
- The Wizard of Oz (1985 video game), an illustrated text adventure game
- The Wizard of Oz (1993 video game), an SNES game
- The Wizard of Oz: Beyond the Yellow Brick Road, a 2008 Nintendo DS game
- The Wizard of Oz (arcade game), a game that awards tokens redeemable for prizes
- The Wizard of Oz, a slot machine from WMS Gaming
- The Wizard of Oz (pinball), a pinball machine from Jersey Jack gaming

== People nicknamed "Wizard of Oz" ==
- Ozzie Smith (born 1954), American baseball player
- Quinten Hann (born 1977), Australian snooker player
- Simon Whitlock (born 1969), Australian darts player
- The reigning champion of the Oz Academy Openweight Championship

== See also ==
- The New Wizard of Oz, 1914 silent film written and directed by L. Frank Baum
- Wizard of Oz experiment, a type of research experiment
- Wizards of Oz, Australian jazz ensemble
- Wizard of Ahhhs, a 2007 album by Black Kids
- The Wonderful Wizard of Oz (disambiguation)
