= The Wizard of Oz (soundtrack) =

Soundtrack of the 1939 Wizard of Oz film

Soundtrack album
- Released: 1956
- Label: MGM

The original soundtrack to the 1939 Metro-Goldwyn-Mayer motion picture The Wizard of Oz was first released in 1956 on MGM Records.

== Background ==
The soundtrack album was issued in 1956 to coincide with the TV premiere of the movie due on November 3.

Until then, the songs were available for purchase in a different recording, made in July 1939 for the Decca label. The Decca album (catalog number 74) featured vocals only by Judy Garland and the Ken Darby Singers, none of the other movie cast members participated.

According to Billboard, editing a soundtrack album was a complex challenge before the advent of stereophonic sound, as dialogue, music, and sound effects were all recorded on the same track. In the case of The Wizard of Oz, planned as the first release by MGM Records, the integration of dialogue and music made it impossible to extract three-minute versions of the songs, except for "Over the Rainbow". The project was abandoned until the introduction of LP records. According to the magazine, by 1967 the film's original soundtrack, which includes both music and dialogue, remains one of MGM's best-selling releases.

== Critical reception ==
Professional ratings
Review scores
Source	Rating
Billboard	Favorable ("Spotlight" pick)
AllMusic	4/5 stars
AllMusic	3/5 stars

The Billboard magazine critic wrote that the album includes the main musical numbers and enough dialogue to tell the story, and that the album is a perfect package for the holiday season, appealing to both children and adults. According to the critic, the sound quality has been enhanced, and the cover is attractive, providing a nostalgic experience, especially for those who want to hear a younger Judy Garland singing "Over the Rainbow" and the comedic performances of Bert Lahr, Ray Bolger, Jack Haley, and Frank Morgan.

The AllMusic review by Marisa Brown praised the album for including extended versions of key songs like "If I Only Had a Brain" and "If I Were King of the Forest", and describes it as a memorable way to celebrate and share a significant piece of American film and music history.

== Track listing ==
LP (MGM Records E3464 ST)

All lyrics are written by E. Y. Harburg; all music is composed by Harold Arlen.

Side 1
No.	Title	Artist	Length
1.	"Over the Rainbow"	Judy Garland
2.	"If I Only Had a Brain"	Ray Bolger
3.	"If I Only Had a Heart"	Jack Haley
4.	"If I Only Had the Nerve"	Bert Lahr
5.	"Ding-Dong! The Witch Is Dead"
6.	"We're Off to See the Wizard"

Side 2
No.	Title	Artist	Length
1.	"If I Were King of the Forest"	Bert Lahr
2.	"Ding-Dong! The Witch Is Dead"
3.	"We're Off to See the Wizard"

== 1995 TCM / Rhino Records deluxe edition ==
The Wizard of Oz

Soundtrack album
- Released: 1995
- Label: TCM Turner Classic Movies Music / Rhino Movie Music

Professional ratings
Review scores
Source	Rating
AllMusic	5/5 stars

In 1995, a deluxe 2-CD edition of the soundtrack was released by Turner Classic Movies (TCM) and Rhino Records. This edition also included the film music composed by Herbert Stothart.

=== Track listing for the deluxe edition ===
Disc one
No.	Title	Length
1.	"Main Title"	1:58
2.	"Trouble in School" (Extended Version)	1:20
3.	"Farmyard" (Outtake)	0:36
4.	"Over the Rainbow"	2:44
5.	"Miss Gulch" (Extended Version)	2:44
6.	"Leaving Home"	1:26
7.	"Crystal Gazing"	1:48
8.	"Cyclone" (Extended Version)	2:17
9.	"Munchkinland"	2:27
10.	"I'm Not a Witch"; 11–20. "Munchkinland Musical Sequence"	0:51
11.	"Come Out, Come Out..."	0:42
12.	"It Really Was No Miracle"	0:59
13.	"We Thank You Very Sweetly"	0:20
14.	"Ding-Dong! The Witch Is Dead"	0:47
15.	"As Mayor of Munchkin City"	0:32
16.	"As Coroner, I Must Aver"	0:31
17.	"Ding-Dong! The Witch Is Dead" (Reprise)	0:46
18.	"The Lullaby League"	0:23
19.	"The Lollipop Guild"	0:24
20.	"We Welcome You to Munchkinland"	0:39
21.	"Threatening Witch" (Extended Version)	2:12
22.	"Leaving Munchkinland"	1:21
23.	"Good Fairy Vanishes"	0:34
24.	"Follow the Yellow Brick Road" / "You're Off to See the Wizard"	0:49
25.	"The Cornfield"	2:46
26.	"If I Only Had a Brain" (Extended Version)	3:44
27.	"We're Off to See the Wizard" (Duo)	0:34
28.	"The Apple Orchard" (Extended Version)	1:35
29.	"If I Only Had a Heart" (Extended Version)	3:12
30.	"Witch on Roof" (Extended Version)	0:53
31.	"Bees & Tin Woodman Lament" (Partial Outtake)	1:53
32.	"We're Off to See the Wizard" (Trio)	0:25
33.	"Into the Forest of Wild Beasts"	1:14
34.	"The Lion's Confession" (Outtake)	0:48
35.	"If I Only Had the Nerve"	0:41
36.	"We're Off to See the Wizard" (Quartet)	0:26
37.	"Poppies"	1:43
38.	"The Spell" (Extended Version)	3:19
39.	"Optimistic Voices"	1:09
40.	"Sign on the Gate" / "The City Gates Open" (Extended Version)	1:16
41.	"The Merry Old Land of Oz"	1:52
42.	"Change of the Guard" (Outtake) / "Wizard's Exit"	0:29
43.	"If I Were King of the Forest" (Extended Version)	4:16
44.	"At the Gates of Emerald City" (Extended Version)	3:13
45.	"Magic Smoke Chords"	0:36
46.	"Terrified Lion"	0:39

Disc two
No.	Title	Note	Length
1.	"The Haunted Forest" (Extended Version)		3:13
2.	"The Jitterbug" (Outtake)		3:23
3.	"The Jitterbug's Attack" (Extended Version)		1:00
4.	"The Witch's Castle" (Extended Version)		3:08
5.	"Toto Brings News" (Extended Version) / "Over the Rainbow" (Reprise) (Outtake)	instrumental /	3:03
6.	"March of the Winkies" (Extended Version)		2:46
7.	"Dorothy's Rescue" (Extended Version)		3:09
8.	"On the Castle Wall" (Extended Version)		2:29
9.	"Ding-Dong! Emerald City" (Outtake)		1:14
10.	"The Wizard's Exposé" (Extended Version) / "Emerald City Graduation Exercises"		3:53
11.	"Fill-In Awards" / "I Was Floating Through Space" / "Balloon Ascension" / "Second Cheer"		1:44
12.	"I Hereby Decree"		4:13
13.	"Delirious Escape" (Extended Version) / "Delirious Escape Continued" / "End Title; 14–36. "Supplemental Material"		3:31
14.	"Main Title" (Alternate Take with Unused Tag)		1:53
15.	"Over the Rainbow" (Partial Take)		0:34
16.	"Over the Rainbow" (Alternate Take)		2:04
17.	"Cyclone" (Final Film Version)		1:57
18.	"Munchkinland Insert" (Alternate Tag)		0:32
19.	"I'm Not a Witch" (Alternate Version)		0:50
20.	"Munchkinland Musical Sequence" (Rehearsal Demo)		5:18
21.	"Ding-Dong! The Witch Is Dead" (Alternate / A Cappella Choir Version)		0:33
22.	"The Lollipop Guild" (Original Munchkin Actors' Voices)		0:26
23.	"Follow the Yellow Brick Road" / "You're Off to See the Wizard" (Orchestral Angles)		0:50
24.	"If I Only Had a Brain" (Unused Dance Music)		2:26
25.	"If I Only Had a Heart" (Unused Version)		1:15
26.	"The Lion's Confession" (Outtake / Alternate Version)		1:15
27.	"Poppies" (Alternate Version with Heavenly Choir)		0:39
28.	"Optimistic Voices" (Rehearsal Demo)		0:36
29.	"Optimistic Voices" (Alternate Vocal Arrangement)		1:09
30.	"The Merry Old Land of Oz" (Orchestra Angles)		1:51
31.	"If I Were King of the Forest" (Partial Take / Alternate Vocal Tag)		0:44
32.	"If I Were King of the Forest" (Alternate Vocal Tag)		0:35
33.	"The Jitterbug" (Choreography Rehearsal)		3:24
34.	"Over the Rainbow Reprise" (Outtake / Alternate Version)		1:31
35.	"Ding-Dong! Emerald City" (Alternate Version)		1:06
36.	"End Title" (Alternate Version)		0:18

== Certifications ==
Certifications for The Wizard of Oz soundtrack
Region	Certification	Certified units/sales
United States (RIAA) 1995 CD	Gold	500,000^{^}
^{^} Shipments figures based on certification alone.

== See also ==
- Musical selections in The Wizard of Oz
