= The Wizard of Oz (1942 musical) =

1942 musical commissioned by the Muny

- Program for Starlight Theatre's; 1953 production
- Music: Harold Arlen
- Lyrics: E. Y. Harburg
- Book: Frank Gabrielson
- Basis: 1939 film The Wizard of Oz and 1900 novel The Wonderful Wizard of Oz by L. Frank Baum
- Productions: St. Louis Municipal Opera, 1942; Starlight Theatre, 1953, 1963, 1984; Cincinnati Playhouse in the Park, 1982, 1990

The Wizard of Oz is a musical commissioned by The Muny (St. Louis Municipal Opera) based on the 1900 novel The Wonderful Wizard of Oz by L. Frank Baum and the 1939 film, The Wizard of Oz, using the film's songs by Harold Arlen and E. Y. Harburg. The book of the musical is by Frank Gabrielson, who would later write an adaptation of The Marvelous Land of Oz (1960) for Shirley Temple.

The musical was first presented in 1942 at The Muny and has been revived many times since, both by The Muny and by other companies.

== Background ==
The Wizard of Oz was first turned into a musical extravaganza by L. Frank Baum himself. It was a loose adaptation of Baum's 1900 novel that had no Wicked Witch, Toto, magic slippers or yellow brick road, but had several new characters and subplots. It first played in Chicago in 1902 and was a success on Broadway the following year. It then toured for seven years. Other early stage and film adaptations of the novel followed, including a 1925 film. The 1939 film adaptation of the novel bore a closer resemblance to the novel's storyline than previous versions. It was a critical success and won the Academy Awards for best song and best score.

== Synopsis ==
=== Act I ===
A teenage girl, Dorothy, lives on a farm in dreary Kansas with her Uncle Henry and Aunt Em dreaming of faraway places ("Over The Rainbow"). One day the farmhouse, with Dorothy inside, is swept off by a tornado to Munchkin land in the Land of Oz. The falling house kills the cruel ruler of the Munchkins, the Wicked Witch of the East. The Munchkins and the Sorceress of the North greet Dorothy ("Ding-Dong! The Witch Is Dead" and "Munchkinland"). The Sorceress tells Dorothy that she will have to go to the Emerald City to ask the great Wizard of Oz to help her return home. The Wicked Witch of the West, sister of the late Wicked Witch of the East, vows revenge upon Dorothy.

Dorothy meets the Scarecrow and the Tin Woodman. The Scarecrow wants to get a brain, and the Tin Woodman needs a heart ("If I Only Had a Brain"/"If I Only Had a Heart"). Dorothy suggests that the Wizard can help them too ("We're Off to See the Wizard"). They then meet the Cowardly Lion ("If I Only Had the Nerve"). The four friends travel down the yellow brick road, having been warned of the lions, tigers, bears and the fantastical jitterbugs who are controlled by the Wicked Witch. When the jitterbugs attack, Dorothy appeals to the Sorceress of the North, who freezes the jitterbugs ("The Jitterbug").

=== Act II ===
The friends finally reach the Emerald City, where they meet Lord Growlie, his daughter Gloria and the Royal Army of Oz. Lord Growlie warns that if someone bothers the Wizard with a foolish request, he may destroy them. Gloria leads Dorothy and friends on a tour ("The Merry Old Land of Oz"), and Ozian girls ask Dorothy to sing about love ("Evening Star"). Finally, the friends meet the Wizard. He is very frightening and says that, before he will help them, they must kill the Wicked Witch of the West. Dorothy and her new friends travel to the castle of the Wicked Witch, who sends various foes to hamper or attack them, but they manage to persevere. The witch eventually captures Dorothy, and her friends try to rescue her, disguising themselves as ghosts. The witch is not fooled and intends to shrink Dorothy and her friends with a magic potion in her cauldron. When the witch threatens the Scarecrow with fire, Dorothy pushes her into the cauldron, shrinking her away to nothing ("Ding-Dong! The Witch Is Dead" (reprise)).

The friends return to the Emerald City, but the Wizard tries to put them off. The Wizard turns out to be an ordinary old man who had journeyed to Oz from Omaha long ago. However, the Wizard provides the Scarecrow, the Tin Woodman and the Cowardly Lion with a diploma, a watch to show large heartedness, and a medal of "courage", respectively, and convinces them all that these items solve their problems. To help Dorothy get home, the Wizard personally escorts her to his new rocket ship, as everyone waves ("Over the Rainbow" (reprise)).

== Songs ==
=== Act I ===
- "Over The Rainbow" – Dorothy
- "Munchkinland" (Ding-Dong! The Witch Is Dead) – Munchkins, Dorothy and Sorceress
- "If I Only Had a Brain" – Scarecrow
- "If I Only Had a Heart" – Tin Woodman
- "We're Off to See the Wizard" (Follow the Yellow Brick Road) – Dorothy, Scarecrow and Tin Woodman
- "If I Only Had the Nerve" – Cowardly Lion
- "The Jitterbug" – Dorothy, Scarecrow, Tin Woodman and Cowardly Lion

=== Act II ===
- "The Merry Old Land of Oz" – Gloria and Company
- "Evening Star" – Dorothy and Chorus
- "Ding-Dong! The Witch Is Dead" (reprise) – Company
- "Over the Rainbow" (reprise) – Company

== Productions ==
In 1942 the St. Louis Municipal Opera (The Muny) presented a new musical stage version of The Wizard of Oz. The script was adapted by Frank Gabrielson from the novel and uses most of the songs from the 1939 film. The original production featured Evelyn Wycoff as Dorothy, Helen Raymond as the Wicked Witch of the West, Patricia Bowman as the Sorceress of the North (i.e. Glinda), Donald Burr as the Tin Man, Edmund Dorsey as the Cowardly Lion, Lee Dixon as the Scarecrow and John Cherry as the Wizard of Oz. A new song was added for Dorothy to sing in the Emerald City, called "Evening Star", with lyrics by Mitchell Parish and music by Peter DeRose, and the music was newly orchestrated for a traditional pit orchestra instrumentation: woodwinds, brass, percussion, piano and strings, with a minimum of 22 musicians. Additional dance music is included, and the Wizard takes Dorothy home in a rocket ship instead of a hot air balloon. Revivals have featured Margaret Hamilton, Cass Daley, Mary Wickes and Phyllis Diller as the Wicked Witch of the West. Cathy Rigby has played Dorothy at The Muny.

Among Gabrielson's many additions are a skeletal butler, "Tibia", serving the Wicked Witch. Other new characters include Joe, Banana Man, Queen of the Butterflies, Old Lady, Lord Growlie, the Wizard's daughter Gloria, and numerous witches. In addition to "Evening Star", "Song Macabre" and "Ghost Dance" are added to the Harold Arlen score. The song "The Jitterbug", which was cut from the film, is inserted instead of the poppy field scene. There is no Toto, Miss Gulch, Professor Marvel, Winkies, Flying Monkeys or magic shoes.

This version of the script is still sometimes used, but it has been largely usurped by John Kane's 1987 version, which adheres more faithfully to the film. According to actor Kurt Raymond, who has performed in both The Muny and 1987 versions, the Muny's adaptation contains "humor that is extremely dated and not quite politically correct", but it has beautiful sets and uses costumes very similar to those seen in the film. Nevertheless, this version was produced by the Starlight Theatre in Kansas City, Missouri, in 1953 with Jo Sullivan as Dorothy, in 1963 with Connie Stevens as Dorothy, and in 1984 with Vicki Lewis as Dorothy. It was also mounted at the Cincinnati Playhouse in the Park in 1982–83 and 1990–91.

== See also ==
- The Wizard of Oz (2011 musical)
- The Wizard of Oz (adaptations)
- Musical selections in The Wizard of Oz
