= The Wizard of Oz (1987 musical) =

Musical by Harold Arlen, Herbert Stothart, E. Y. Harburg and John Kane

- Poster from the original 1987 RSC production
- Music: Harold Arlen; Herbert Stothart
- Lyrics: E. Y. Harburg
- Book: John Kane
- Basis: The Wonderful Wizard of Oz by L. Frank Baum; The Wizard of Oz, screenplay by Noel Langley, Florence Ryerson, Edgar Allan Woolf
- Productions: 1987 Barbican Centre (North London); 1989 The Wizard of Oz Live! Arena Show; 1993 U.S. Tour; 1997 Madison Square Garden; 2008 US Tour; 2017 US Tour

The Wizard of Oz is a musical with a book by John Kane, music by Harold Arlen and lyrics by E. Y. Harburg. It has additional background music by Herbert Stothart. It is based on the 1900 novel The Wonderful Wizard of Oz by L. Frank Baum and the 1939 film version written by Noel Langley, Florence Ryerson and Edgar Allan Woolf.

Successful musicals based on the Baum novel were created in 1902 (for Broadway) and in 1942 (for St. Louis Municipal Opera), the latter of which, using songs from the popular 1939 film, is still frequently revived. Seeking to more closely recreate the 1939 film on stage, the Royal Shakespeare Company adapted the film's screenplay, also using the songs from the film, and produced a new version at London's Barbican Centre in 1987. This was also a success and has been given many revivals in various formats. It also had extensive tours the U.S. from 2008 to 2020. The musical has become a popular musical for community theatres, schools and children's theatres in the United States and the United Kingdom.

== Background and creation ==
The Wizard of Oz was first turned into a musical extravaganza by L. Frank Baum himself. A loose adaptation of Baum's 1900 novel (there is no Wicked Witch, magic shoes or Toto, and there are some new characters), it first played in Chicago in 1902 and was a success on Broadway the following year. It then toured for seven years. The 1939 film adaptation bore a closer resemblance to the storyline of Baum's original novel than most previous versions. It was a strong success, won the Academy Awards for best song and best score, and has been frequently broadcast on television. This was followed, in 1942, by a musical theatre adaptation presented at the St. Louis Municipal Opera (MUNY). The script was adapted by Frank Gabrielson from the novel, but it is influenced in some respects by the motion picture script and uses most of the songs from the film. A new song was added for Dorothy to sing in the Emerald City, called "Evening Star", and the Wizard goes home in a rocketship instead of a hot air balloon. The MUNY version continues to receive frequent revivals.

According to Royal Shakespeare Company (RSC) director Ian Judge, the company's 1987 adaptation "came about when Terry Hands, artistic director of the company, asked for a show that could be performed annually over the Christmas season, as a revival of J. M. Barrie's play Peter Pan had been previously. ... Judge obtained the rights to the [1939] film. ... An additional verse has been put back into the Academy Award-winning song 'Over the Rainbow,' as well as an entire number, 'The Jitterbug,' that was cut from the movie. Every word of the screenplay has been left in. 'We've just fattened it out a little bit because you need a few more words in the theater than you need in the movies.'" In 1986, John Kane was asked by the company to write the book for the adaptation. This version hews even more closely to the film's screenplay than the 1942 MUNY version and attempts to recreate the film's atmosphere and some of its special effects. It also involves more singing for the chorus.

== Synopsis ==
=== Act 1 ===
Dorothy Gale, a young girl living on a Kansas farm with her Aunt Em and Uncle Henry, dreams of escaping her mundane life ("Over the Rainbow"). The family's mean neighbor, Miss Gulch, threatens to impound Dorothy's cherished dog, Toto, so Dorothy and Toto run away. They meet up with kindly Professor Marvel, who subtly convinces Dorothy to return home. Suddenly a tornado hits, and Dorothy and Toto, seeking shelter in the house, are transported to the Land of Oz.

In Oz, Dorothy meets Glinda, the Good Witch of the North. Apparently, Dorothy's house has landed upon – and fatally stricken – the Wicked Witch of the East. The Munchkins, now freed from the Wicked Witch of the East, celebrate and hail Dorothy as their new heroine ("Ding Dong! The Witch Is Dead/Munchkin Musical Sequence"). Suddenly, the Wicked Witch of the West appears, interrupting the celebration and seeking vengeance. Unable to reclaim her sister's shoes, which are now on Dorothy's feet, the Witch vows to return and disappears in a cloud of smoke. Dorothy, seeking a way back home to Kansas, sets off to see the Wizard of Oz ("Follow the Yellow Brick Road").

Along the way, Dorothy meets three new friends, each of whom bemoans the lack a crucial characteristic: The Scarecrow ("If I Only Had a Brain") the Tinman ("If I Only Had a Heart") and the Lion ("If I Only Had the Nerve"). Together, the four new companions make their way towards Oz ("We're Off to See the Wizard"). The Witch attempts to sedate the travelers with a poisonous field of poppies, but Glinda reverses the spell with healing snowflakes ("Poppies" (Act One Finale)).

=== Act 2 ===
The travelers, arriving at the Emerald City, are delayed by a stubborn Gatekeeper, but Dorothy's tears convince him to relent and let them in ("Merry Old Land of Oz"). As the group awaits its audience with the Wizard, the Lion boasts he is "King of The Forest". Finally, they meet the imposing and irritable Wizard, who demands the broomstick of the Wicked Witch of the West.

The four friends travel deep into the haunted forest. Suddenly, they encounter jitterbugs, who make them dance until they collapse from exhaustion ("The Jitterbug"). The Wicked Witch's flying monkeys swoop down, capturing Dorothy and Toto. At the castle, the Witch vows to take Dorothy's life. Meanwhile, the Lion, Scarecrow and Tinman infiltrate the castle disguised as Winkie guards. The foursome and Toto are reunited, but the Wicked Witch interferes, threatening the Scarecrow with fire. Dorothy, dousing the flames with a bucket of water, accidentally strikes the Witch, who smolders and melts into nothing ("Ding Dong the Witch Is Dead" (reprise)). The four friends, triumphant, take the Witch's broom back to the Wizard.

The Wizard remains imperious and imposing, but Toto pulls aside a curtain to reveal a meek and ordinary man speaking into a microphone. The Wizard, revealed to be a "humbug", nonetheless grants each traveler's request, giving the Scarecrow, the Tinman, and the Lion each a token of his newly-acquired ability. The Wizard offers to take Dorothy back to Kansas in his hot-air balloon, but the balloon accidentally takes off, and Dorothy is left alone and crestfallen. Glinda appears and explains that Dorothy has always had the power to return home. All she has to do is close her eyes, tap her heels together three times, and repeat to herself, "There's no place like home."

Back in Kansas, Dorothy awakens, confused, with a bump on her head. Reunited with all her loved ones, and relieved to learn the storm has left Miss Gulch incapacitated by a broken leg, Dorothy shares the tale of her miraculous journey, celebrating the joy and healing power of home.

== Musical numbers ==
=== Act One ===
- Overture – Orchestra with Female Chorus
- Over the Rainbow – Dorothy
- Cyclone – Orchestra
- Munchkinland Music Sequence (Come Out, Come Out; It Really Was No Miracle; Ding Dong! The Witch is Dead; Lullaby League/Lollipop Guild) – Glinda, Dorothy and Munchkins
- Follow the Yellow Brick Road/You’re Off to See the Wizard – Dorothy and Munchkins
- If I Only Had a Brain – Scarecrow, Dorothy and Crows
- We're Off to See the Wizard – Dorothy and Scarecrow
- If I Only Had a Heart – Tinman, Dorothy and Apple Trees
- We're Off to See the Wizard (reprise) – Dorothy, Scarecrow and Tinman
- If I Only Had the Nerve – Cowardly Lion, Dorothy, Scarecrow and Tinman
- We're Off to See the Wizard (reprise) – Dorothy, Scarecrow, Tinman and Lion
- Poppies/Out of the Woods/Act One Finale – Dorothy, Scarecrow, Tinman, Lion, Glinda and Chorus

=== Act Two ===
- Entr'acte/Optimistic Voices – Orchestra with Female Chorus
- The Merry Old Land of Oz – Dorothy, Tinman, Scarecrow, Lion, Guard and Ozians
- If I Were King of the Forest – Lion, Dorothy, Scarecrow and Tinman
- March of the Winkies – Winkie Guards
- The Jitterbug – Dorothy, Scarecrow, Tinman, Lion and Jitterbugs
- Over the Rainbow (reprise) – Dorothy
- Ding-Dong! The Witch Is Dead (reprise) – Winkies
- Finale – Full Company

=== Notes ===
In the 1998 Madison Square Garden & national touring production, the Wicked Witch sang the first few verses of “The Jitterbug.”

== Productions ==
=== 1987 Original London production ===
The RSC premiered the musical over Christmas 1987 at the Barbican Centre; it based its costumes on a combination of the book's original artwork and the style of the then-popular musical The Wiz. The original cast featured Imelda Staunton as Dorothy Gale; Bille Brown (in drag) as Miss Gulch/the Wicked Witch of the West; Dilys Laye and later Joyce Grant as Aunt Em/Glinda, the Good Witch of the North; and Trevor Peacock as Zeke/the Cowardly Lion and Sebastian Shaw as The Wizard of Oz/Professor Marvel. When the same production was reproduced in 1988, Gillian Bevan played Dorothy. The production was an immediate success in London when it opened at London's Barbican Theatre. The Times reviewer wrote: "This is, to come out with it immediately, the most marvellous show."

The RSC revived the show the following season, again with Gillian Bevan as Dorothy, and recorded a cast album of the show. The staging has been repeated frequently by musical theatre companies in the United Kingdom.

=== 1988 United States premiere ===
The RSC version's first outing in the U.S. was in 1988 in a production starring Cathy Rigby as Dorothy (she had made her musical debut in the role in a 1981 MUNY revival) and Lara Teeter as the Scarecrow. This was presented by the Long Beach Civic Light Opera (Long Beach, California) from July 14 to July 31, 1988.

=== 1989 The Wizard of Oz Live! Arena Show ===
In 1989, in celebration of the 50th anniversary of the film, the RSC script and score were adapted into an arena-style touring production in the U.S. According to USA Today, the show was "Built to play about 70 stadiums across the country, the $5 million production opened Wednesday at Radio City Music Hall." The production, with many dramatic and, according to critics, ill-advised design features, was not well received and had a short run, closing quietly in 1990.

=== 1990s productions ===
==== 1991–1992 Australian tour ====
The RSC production had its Australian premiere at the State Theatre, Melbourne in January to February 1991. The production played in December 1991 in Brisbane and January to February 1992 in Adelaide. The cast included Tamsin West as Dorothy, Cameron Daddo as Hunk/Scarecrow (replaced by Brian Rooney in Brisbane and Adelaide), David Whitney as Hickory/The Tinman, Pamela Rabe as Miss Gulch/Wicked Witch and John Gaden as Professor Marvel/The Wizard (replaced by Bert Newton in Brisbane and Adelaide).

==== 1992 Paper Mill Playhouse ====
In 1992, the Paper Mill Playhouse, Millburn, New Jersey, produced the Royal Shakespeare Company's version. Eddie Bracken was featured as a Guard and the Wizard. The New York Times review noted that "Robert Johanson and James Rocco, sharing credit for direction and choreography, are attempting to relive the movie with up-to-the-minute stage effects. Ergo. Comes the cyclone, the cow flies. The farmhouse zooms over the first rows and lands back on stage, in the manner of the Phantom's crashing chandelier. Dorothy is suspended, Peter Pan-like, on high wires. All manner of creeping, crawling creatures augment the ascending ones; monkeys levitate, spookily; everyone, it appears, sooner or later, ascends, over and over."

==== 1993 U.S. tour ====
The RSC version was used in the first U.S. stage touring production based on the film, beginning in 1993. The Boston Herald reported that the show was "complete with all the beloved songs by Harold Arlen and E. Y. Harburg. It's well-acted and extremely well-sung by a cast that draws on the movie classic's indelible characterizations of Dorothy, the Scarecrow, the Tin Man, the Cowardly Lion, etc."

==== 1995 The Wizard of Oz in Concert: Dreams Come True ====
This version used the RSC version and was filmed for television by the TNT network with an all-star cast, including Jewel as Dorothy and Joel Grey as the Wizard. Jackson Browne, Roger Daltrey and Nathan Lane played the Scarecrow, Tin Man and Lion, respectively. Debra Winger played the Wicked Witch. A cast album was made that includes more of the music from the show than the 1989 RSC recording as well as some dialogue.

==== 1997 Madison Square Garden production ====
The Theater at Madison Square Garden, New York production opened in May 1997 for 48 performances. Co-produced by the Paper Mill Playhouse, it used a shorter version of the show, 90 minutes long, and a score designed for younger audiences. Directed by Paper Mill artistic director Robert Johanson, the cast included Roseanne Barr as the Wicked Witch of the West and Ken Page, Lara Teeter and Michael Gruber as the Lion, Scarecrow and Tin Man, respectively.

This production was repeated in May 1998 at Madison Square Garden. It featured Mickey Rooney as the Wizard and Eartha Kitt as the Wicked Witch of the West. Most of the 1997 cast returned, and it was this cast that made the cast recording associated with this version. While the show went on tour across the country, Liliane Montevecchi replaced Kitt as the Wicked Witch. Jo Anne Worley later played the role. The US tour ended in 1999.

=== 2000s ===
==== 2001 Australia ====
From November 2001 to February 2002, a production directed by Nancye Hayes was staged at the Lyric Theatre in Sydney, Australia. This version followed the movie version very closely in design. The cast included pop-star Nikki Webster as Dorothy, Delia Hannah as Aunt Em/Glinda, Kane Alexander as Hunk/Scarecrow, Doug Parkinson as Zeke/Cowardly Lion, Pamela Rabe as Miss Gulch/Wicked Witch, and Bert Newton as Professor Marvel/The Wizard. The following year, the production transferred to the Regent Theatre in Melbourne, and then to the Lyric Theatre in Brisbane, where Patti Newton (the wife of Bert Newton) and Derek Metzger, respectively, played Aunt Em/Glinda and Hunk/Scarecrow.

==== 2008 and 2017 U.S. tours ====
A touring production of the show ran in cities across the U.S. from October 2008 to January 2012.

Another touring production began running across the U.S. in October 2017. It features new scenic design, costumes & choreography.

=== 2020s ===
==== 2021 Pittsburgh ====
A production from Pittsburgh CLO played at Acrisure Stadium (then known as Heinz Field) from July 8–10, 2021 with Jessica Grové reprising the role of Dorothy, which she had played in the Madison Square Garden production.

==== 2023 San Francisco ====
A production from the American Conservatory Theater played in San Francisco from June 1–25, 2023. Sam Pinkleton directed, with costume and scenic design by David Zinn.

== See also ==
- The Wizard of Oz adaptations
- Musical selections in The Wizard of Oz
