= The Wizard of Oz (2011 musical) =

2011 musical based on the 1939 film

- Original 2011 London production artwork
- Music: Harold Arlen; Andrew Lloyd Webber (additional)
- Lyrics: E. Y. Harburg; Tim Rice (additional)
- Book: Andrew Lloyd Webber; Jeremy Sams
- Basis: 1939 film The Wizard of Oz and 1900 novel The Wonderful Wizard of Oz by L. Frank Baum
- Productions: 2011 West End; 2012 Toronto; 2013 North American tour; 2015 North American tour; 2017 Australian tour; 2022 Leicester; 2023 West End revival; 2023 UK tour; 2024 West End revival

The Wizard of Oz is a musical based on the 1939 film of the same name in turn based on L. Frank Baum's novel The Wonderful Wizard of Oz, with a book adapted by Andrew Lloyd Webber and Jeremy Sams. The musical uses the Harold Arlen and E. Y. Harburg songs from the film and includes some new songs and additional music by Lloyd Webber and additional lyrics by Tim Rice. It is the third stage musical adaptation of the film following the 1942 version for the St. Louis Municipal Opera (The Muny) and the 1987 version for the Royal Shakespeare Company.

After previews in the West End from 7 February, the musical opened on 1 March 2011, directed by Jeremy Sams, and closed on 2 September 2012. The roles and original cast included Danielle Hope as Dorothy Gale, and Sophie Evans as alternative Dorothy, Michael Crawford as the Wizard, Paul Keating as the Scarecrow, Edward Baker-Duly as the Tin Man, David Ganly as the Cowardly Lion, Helen Walsh as Aunt Em, Stephen Scott as Uncle Henry, Emily Tierney was Glinda the Good Witch of the North, Hannah Waddingham as the Wicked Witch of the West, and four different West Highland Terriers alternated in the role of Toto. The role of Dorothy was cast through the 2010 reality television show Over the Rainbow, in which Hope won and Evans was the runner-up. After a similar Canadian reality TV search show, a Toronto production (starring Danielle Wade as Dorothy) began in December 2012 and closed in August 2013, and was followed by a North American tour. In April 2017 an Australian tour was announced including a season at the Lyric Theatre, Queensland Performing Arts Centre, the Capitol Theatre in Sydney, and at the Adelaide Festival Theatre. The cast includes Anthony Warlow as the Wizard, with Lucy Durack as Glinda the Good Witch and Jemma Rix as Wicked Witch of the West. In 2023, the musical was revived at the London Palladium for a limited season, following a run at Curve, Leicester.

== Background ==
The Wizard of Oz is a 2011 musical based on 1939 film The Wizard of Oz, as well as L. Frank Baum's novel, The Wonderful Wizard of Oz.

The Wizard of Oz was first turned into a musical extravaganza by Baum himself. A loose adaptation based on his 1900 novel, The Wonderful Wizard of Oz (there is no Wicked Witch or Toto, and there are some new characters) first played in Chicago in 1902, and was a success on Broadway the following year. It then toured for nine years. The 1939 film adaptation bore a closer resemblance to the storyline of Baum's original novel than most previous versions. It was a strong success, winning the Academy Awards for Best Original Song and Original Score, and continues to be broadcast perennially.

The Wizard of Oz, 2011 musical, is the third stage musical adaptation of the film, following the 1945 version for the St. Louis Municipal Opera (The Muny) and the 1987 version for the Royal Shakespeare Company. In 1945, the St. Louis Municipal Opera (MUNY) created a version with a script adapted by Frank Gabrielson from the novel, but it is influenced in some respects by the motion picture screenplay. It uses most of the songs from the film. This was followed, in 1987, by a Royal Shakespeare Company (RSC) adaptation designed to more closely recreate the film version. The book by John Kane closely follows the film's screenplay, and it uses nearly all of the film's music. Both the MUNY and RSC adaptations were successes and have been revived numerous times in the US and UK.

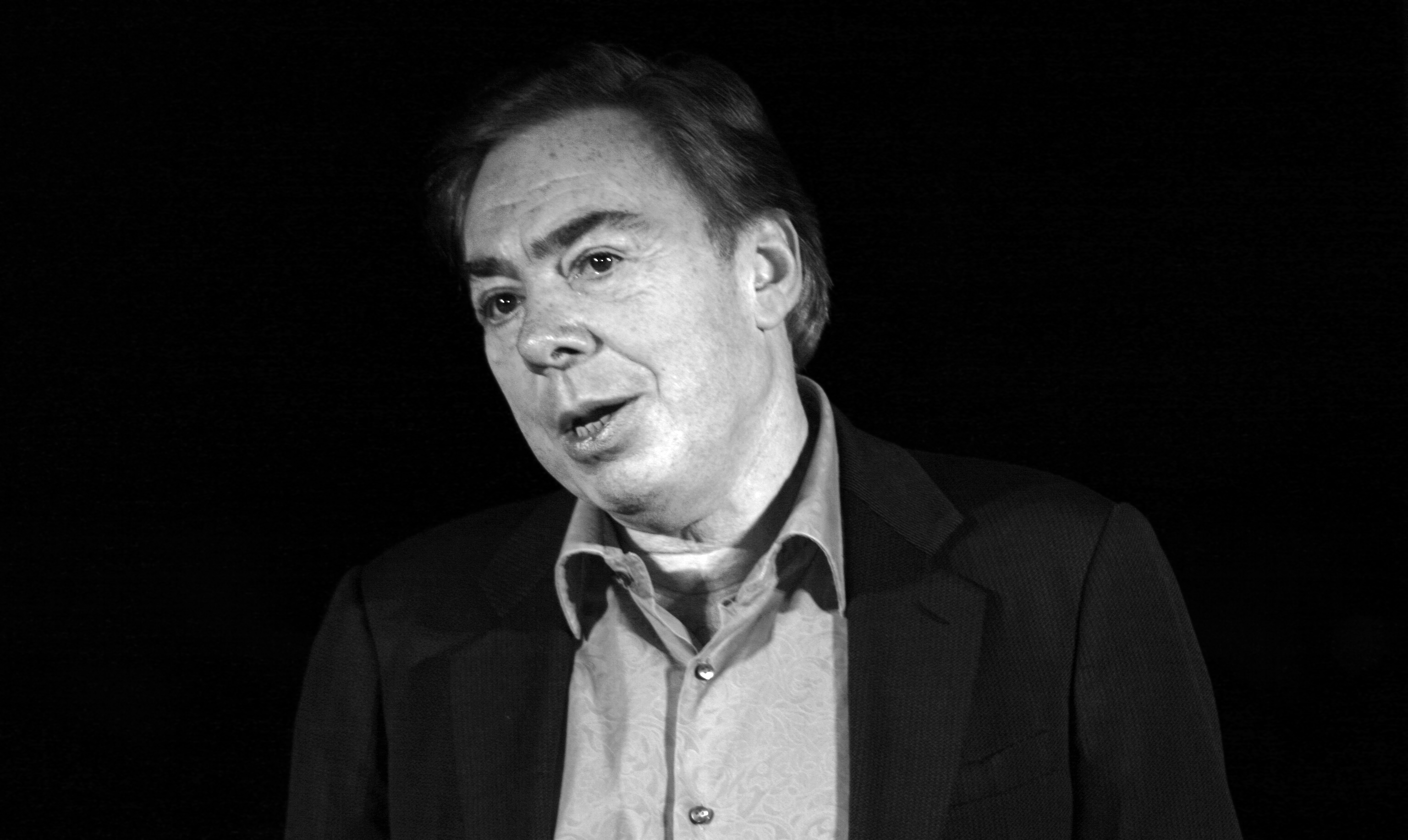
Andrew Lloyd Webber

The Wizard of Oz is Andrew Lloyd Webber's 18th musical. Tim Rice first collaborated with Lloyd Webber in 1965, together writing The Likes of Us. Their next piece was Joseph and the Amazing Technicolor Dreamcoat, followed by two more concept albums that became hit musicals, Jesus Christ Superstar (1971) and Evita (1978). Except for a special collaboration for Queen Elizabeth's 60th birthday celebration, the musical Cricket in 1986, after Evita, each man turned to other collaborators to produce further well-known musical theatre works.

To create the new musical, Lloyd Webber and director Jeremy Sams adapted the 1939 film's screenplay, and Rice and Lloyd Webber added several new songs to the film's score.

== Production history ==
=== West End (2011–12) ===
After previews beginning 7 February, the musical opened in the West End, at the London Palladium, on 1 March 2011. The role of Dorothy was originated by Danielle Hope, who was selected through the reality television show Over the Rainbow, and the title role of the Wizard was created by Michael Crawford. Over the Rainbow runner-up Sophie Evans performed the role of Dorothy on Tuesday evenings and when Hope was ill or on holiday. Hannah Waddingham originated the role of the Wicked Witch of the West and was replaced in September 2011 by her understudy, Marianne Benedict. Hope and Crawford left the production on 5 February 2012. Evans replaced Hope in the role of Dorothy full-time in February 2012, and Russell Grant took over soon afterwards as The Wizard, for 14 weeks. Des O'Connor portrayed The Wizard from May 2012 until the production closed.

The musical was produced by Lloyd Webber and Bill Kenwright, with direction by Jeremy Sams, choreography by Arlene Phillips and sets and costumes by Robert Jones. It took in pre-opening sales of £10 million. The production celebrated its 500th performance on 9 May 2012 and closed on 2 September 2012.

=== Toronto (2012–13) and North American tours (2013–14; 2015–16) ===
An autumn 2012 reality TV show, Over the Rainbow, hosted by Daryn Jones, searched for a Canadian girl to play the role of Dorothy in a Toronto staging by Mirvish Productions. On 5 November 2012, viewers of the show chose Danielle Wade, a 20-year-old University of Windsor acting major, to play the role, with Stephanie La Rochelle as first runner up. The production premiered on 20 December 2012 at the Ed Mirvish Theatre with an official opening on 13 January 2013. Besides Wade, the all-Canadian cast also included Cedric Smith as Professor Marvel/the Wizard, Lisa Horner as Miss Gulch/The Wicked Witch of the West, Mike Jackson as the Tin Man, Lee MacDougall as the Cowardly Lion, Jamie McKnight as the Scarecrow and Robin Evan Willis as Glinda. The production concluded its run on 18 August 2013, having been seen by over 500,000 people.

The musical received a North American tour beginning on 10 September 2013 at the Smith Center for the Performing Arts in Las Vegas, Nevada, with the original Canadian cast, except that Jacquelyn Piro Donovan played Miss Gulch/The Wicked Witch of the West. It concluded on 29 June 2014 at the Detroit Opera House. The musical received a second North American tour beginning on 1 December 2015 at the Playhouse Square in Cleveland, Ohio, the all-American cast included Sarah Lasko as Dorothy, Mark A. Harmon as Professor Marvel/The Wizard, Shani Hadjian as Miss Gulch/The Wicked Witch of the West, Aaron Fried as Zeke/The Cowardly Lion, Jay McGill as Hickory/The Tin Man, Morgan Reynolds as Hunk/The Scarecrow, Rachel Womble as Glinda, Randy Charleville as Uncle Henry, and Emmanuelle Zeesman as Auntie Em. It concluded on 17 July 2016 at the Straz Center for the Performing Arts in Tampa, Florida. (Note: Attributed to multiple references:)

=== Australian tour (2017–18) ===
The musical began touring Australia beginning 4 November 2017 at the Lyric Theatre, Queensland Performing Arts Centre in Brisbane, Queensland, followed by a season at the Capitol Theatre, Sydney in Sydney from 30 December 2017. The cast included Anthony Warlow as the Wizard, Lucy Durack as Glinda the Good Witch, Jemma Rix as the Wicked Witch of the West, and Samantha Dodemaide as Dorothy. Durack and Rix previously portrayed Glinda and Elphaba respectively in the Australian production of Wicked.

=== Leicester (2022–23) ===
The musical was scheduled to make its UK regional premiere in a new production directed by Nikolai Foster at the Curve, Leicester over the Christmas 2020 season. However, due to the COVID-19 pandemic the production was postponed to the Christmas 2021 season before being postponed again to the Christmas 2022 season. The cast includes Georgina Onuorah as Dorothy with Jonny Fines as the Scarecrow, Paul French as the Tin Man, Giovanni Spanó as The Lion, Ben Thompson controlling the puppet of Toto, Christina Bianco as Glinda the Good Witch, Mark Peachey as the Wizard, and Charlotte Jaconelli as the Wicked Witch of The West.

=== West End revival (2023) ===
On 1 December 2022, it was announced that the Leicester production would transfer to London's West End at the London Palladium (where the original 2011 production also ran) for a limited season from 23 June to 3 September 2023, with an official opening night on 6 July. It is produced by Michael Harrison, starring Jason Manford as the Cowardly Lion, Ashley Banjo as the Tin Man, and Gary Wilmot as the Wizard and Professor Marvel, who previously played the Scarecrow and the Cowardly Lion in the 1987 version. Also featured in the cast are Louis Gaunt as the Scarecrow, Dianne Pilkington as the Wicked Witch, and Bianco and Onuorah reprising their roles of Glinda and Dorothy, respectively, from the Leicester production. The set design was by Colin Richmond, with projections by Douglas O'Connell, costumes and puppetry by Rachel Canning and lighting by Ben Cracknell.

=== UK and Ireland tour (2023–24) and West End revival (2024) ===
It was also announced that the Leicester/London production toured the UK and Ireland beginning at the Liverpool Empire Theatre from 13 December 2023 until August 2024 with further dates to be announced, starring Aston Merrygold as the Tin Man and The Vivienne and Craig Revel Horwood as the Wicked Witch, with Wilmot returning as the Wizard.

The production also returned to the West End from 15 August 2024 for a limited 4 week run at the Gillian Lynne Theatre with Merrygold and The Vivienne reprising their roles from the tour as the Tin Man and the Wicked Witch.

== Plot ==
Act I

Orphaned teenager Dorothy Gale lives on a farm in Kansas with her Aunt Em, Uncle Henry and dog Toto, but feels misunderstood ("Nobody Understands Me"). The unpleasant Miss Gulch threatens to call the sheriff after Toto bites her leg. Dorothy wants to escape to a nicer place, somewhere ("Over the Rainbow"). She runs away from the farm and meets Professor Marvel, who tells her all about ("Wonders of the World"). They are interrupted by a twister, and Dorothy runs home for shelter. Inside the farmhouse, she bangs her head on the bedside. The house is blown away by the storm.

Landing in Oz, Dorothy's house flattens the Wicked Witch of the East. Glinda, the Good Witch of the North, greets Dorothy and tells her where she is. Glinda calls for the Munchkins to come out. These little people, overjoyed at the demise of their wicked tormentor, welcome Dorothy and Toto ("Munchkinland Sequence"). Glinda presents Dorothy with the magic ruby slippers that belonged to the dead witch. This enrages the witch's sister, the Wicked Witch of the West. Glinda tells Dorothy that the Wizard of Oz might be able to help her return home, and how to find him. Dorothy sets off toward the Emerald City to speak to the great Oz ("Follow the Yellow Brick Road").

On her way, she meets the Scarecrow, who feels inadequate with a head full of only stuffing ("If I Only Had A Brain"). Dorothy invites him to travel with her, hoping the Wizard can help him ("We're Off to See the Wizard"). They soon meet the Tin Man, who is unhappy with his empty tin chest ("If I Only Had a Heart") and invite him to join them. The Wicked Witch of the West threatens to light the Scarecrow on fire unless Dorothy gives her the ruby slippers; Dorothy refuses. In the dark forest, they encounter a very unhappy Lion, afraid of his own tail ("If I Only Had the Nerve"). He too joins the group on the road to the Emerald City.

Emerging into the light, the friends encounter another obstacle. The Wicked Witch has cast a spell creating a huge field of poppies that puts Dorothy and the Lion to sleep. Glinda counters with a snowfall that nullifies the poison, so the friends may continue on their journey ("We're Outta the Woods"). Arriving at the Emerald City, Dorothy and company persuade the gatekeeper to admit them. They are welcomed with open arms and are groomed in preparation for a meeting with the Wizard ("The Merry Old Land of Oz"). The Wicked Witch flies down into the city with more threats, still angry that she doesn't have the ruby slippers. The four friends and Toto go into the Wizard's chamber. The great Oz appears as a frightening, disembodied head and says he will grant the group their wishes if they do something for him first. He demands: they must bring him the broomstick of the Witch of the West ("Bring Me the Broomstick").

Act II

In a forest on the way to the castle of the Wicked Witch of the West, the group tries to figure out how to steal the broomstick ("We Went to See the Wizard"). They hide from a group of the Witch's Winkies ("March of the Winkies"). Meanwhile, in her castle, the Witch sends her flying monkeys to capture Dorothy and Toto and bring them to the castle ("Red Shoes Blues"). She imprisons Dorothy and tells her to give up the slippers within the hour or die ("Red Shoes Blues" (Reprise)). Dorothy wishes more than ever that she was back at home and cries ("Over the Rainbow" (Reprise)). The Scarecrow, Tin Man and Lion consider how to rescue her from the Witch's castle ("If We Only Had a Plan"). They disguise themselves as Winkies and sneak into the castle ("March of the Winkies" (Reprise)). They find the Witch and Dorothy. When the Witch tries to attack the Scarecrow, a Winkie hands Dorothy a bucket of water, which she throws over the Witch, melting her. The Winkies are thrilled to be free of the wicked witch, and the quartet return to Emerald City with the broomstick to be greeted by a large celebration of the demise of the Witch, including the people of Emerald City, the Munchkins and the Winkies ("Hail-Hail! The Witch Is Dead").

Dorothy and her friends go to see the Wizard with the broomstick. Toto reveals that the Wizard's fearsome visage is an illusion; he is just an ordinary man. Still, he gives the Scarecrow, Tin Man and Lion tokens of the brains, heart and courage that they already had inside of them ("You Went to See the Wizard"). He tells Dorothy that he himself will take her to Kansas in his hot air balloon, appointing the Scarecrow as prime minister of Oz, with the Tin Man and Lion as other ministers. Just before the balloon flies off, Toto runs into the crowd, and Dorothy retrieves him, missing her ride; she is seemingly stranded in Oz ("Farewell to Oz"). Glinda appears to tell her that she and Toto had the power to return home all along ("Already Home"). After saying goodbye to her friends, Dorothy taps her heels together three times, chanting "There's no place like home".

Back in Kansas, Aunt Em and Uncle Henry tell Dorothy that she hit her head and had been unconscious for days. Dorothy insists her adventure in Oz was real, not a dream, but she is very grateful to be home. As Aunt Em and Uncle Henry leave her alone in her bedroom to rest, a gust of wind blows open her cupboard door, revealing the ruby slippers ("Finale").

== Cast and characters ==
Character	West End	Toronto	North American tour	North American tour	Australian tour	West End	UK tour	West End
Character	2011	2012	2013	2015	2017	2023		2024
Dorothy	Danielle Hope	Danielle Wade	Danielle Wade	Sarah Lasko	Samantha Leigh Dodemaide	Georgina Onuorah	Aviva Tulley	Aviva Tulley
The Wizard of Oz / Professor Marvel	Michael Crawford	Cedric Smith	Cedric Smith	Mark A. Harmon	Anthony Warlow	Gary Wilmot	Allan Stewart Alex Bourne Gary Wilmot	Allan Stewart Alex Bourne
The Scarecrow / Hunk	Paul Keating	Jamie McKnight	Jamie McKnight	Morgan Reynolds	Eli Cooper	Louis Gaunt	Benjamin Yates	Benjamin Yates
The Tin Man / Hickory	Edward Baker-Duly	Mike Jackson	Mike Jackson	Jay McGill	Alex Rathgeber	Ashley Banjo	Aston Merrygold Marley Fenton Femi Akinfolarin	Aston Merrygold Femi Akinfolarin
The Cowardly Lion / Zeke	David Ganly	Lee MacDougall	Lee MacDougall	Aaron Fried	John Xintavelonis	Jason Manford	Nic Greenshields Jason Manford	Nic Greenshields
The Wicked Witch of the West / Miss Gulch	Hannah Waddingham	Lisa Horner	Jacquelyn Piro Donovan	Shani Hadjian	Jemma Rix	Dianne Pilkington	The Vivienne Craig Revel Horwood	The Vivienne
Glinda the Good Witch	Emily Tierney	Robin Evan Willis	Robin Evan Willis	Rachel Womble	Lucy Durack	Christina Bianco	Emily Bull	Emily Bull
Aunt Em	Helen Walsh	Charlotte Moore	Charlotte Moore	Emmanuelle Zeesman	Sophie Weiss	Jacqui Dubois	Emily Bull	Emily Bull
Uncle Henry	Stephen Scott	Larry Mannell	Larry Mannell	Randy Charleville	Paul Hanlon	Geoffrey Aymer	David Burrows	David Burrows
Toto *	—N/a	—N/a	—N/a	—N/a	Ben Thompson	Abigail Matthews	Abigail Matthews	Abigail Matthews

* Toto, Dorothy's dog, was played by four different West Highland White Terriers in the Original West End production.

=== Notable replacements ===
==== West End (2011-12) ====
- Dorothy: Sophie Evans
- Professor Marvel/The Wizard: Russell Grant, Des O'Connor

== Musical numbers ==
=== Music ===
Most of the musical's songs are taken from the 1939 film and were written by Harold Arlen and E. Y. Harburg. New numbers written by Andrew Lloyd Webber and Tim Rice include a song for Professor Marvel ("Wonders of the World") and the Wicked Witch of the West ("Red Shoes Blues"), two songs for the Wizard ("Bring Me the Broomstick" and "Farewell to Oz") and another song for Dorothy ("Nobody Understands Me"). A song featured in the film but omitted in the musical is "If I Were King of the Forest." Also not used in this musical was "The Jitterbug".

Act I

- "Overture" – Orchestra and Ensemble
- "Nobody Understands Me"* – Dorothy, Aunt Em, Uncle Henry, Hunk, Hickory, Zeke and Miss Gulch
- "Over the Rainbow" – Dorothy
- "Wonders of the World"* – Professor Marvel and Dorothy
- "The Twister" – Orchestra
- "Arrival in Munchkinland" – Orchestra
- Munchkinland Sequence: "Come Out, Come Out"/"It Really Was No Miracle"/"Ding-Dong! The Witch Is Dead"/"We Welcome You to Munchkinland" – Glinda, Dorothy and Munchkins
- "Follow the Yellow Brick Road/You're Off to See the Wizard" – Dorothy and Munchkins
- "If I Only Had a Brain"/"We're Off to See the Wizard" – Scarecrow and Dorothy
- "If I Only Had a Heart"/"We're Off to See the Wizard" – Tin Man, Scarecrow and Dorothy
- "If I Only Had the Nerve"/"We're Off to See the Wizard" – Lion, Tin Man, Scarecrow and Dorothy
- "We're Outta the Woods" – Dorothy, Lion, Scarecrow, Tin Man and Offstage Chorus
- "The Merry Old Land of Oz" – Dorothy, Scarecrow, Tin Man, Lion and Emerald Citizens
- "Bring Me the Broomstick"* – The Wizard

Act II

- "Entr'acte" – Orchestra
- "We Went to See the Wizard"** – Dorothy, Scarecrow, Tin Man and Lion
- "March of the Winkies" – Winkies
- "Red Shoes Blues"* – The Wicked Witch of the West and Winkies
- "Bacchanalia"*** – Orchestra
- "Red Shoes Blues" (Reprise)* – The Wicked Witch of the West
- "Over the Rainbow" (Reprise)** – Dorothy
- "If We Only Had a Plan"** – Lion, Tin Man and Scarecrow
- "March of the Winkies" (Reprise) – Winkies/Emerald Citizens, Dorothy, Tin Man, Scarecrow and Lion
- "The Rescue" – Orchestra
- "Hail-Hail! The Witch Is Dead" – Ensemble
- "You Went to See the Wizard"** – The Wizard
- "Farewell to Oz"* – The Wizard
- "Already Home"* – Glinda, Dorothy and Ensemble
- "Finale" – Dorothy

*denotes new song by Lloyd Webber and Rice.
**denotes new lyric by Rice.
***denotes new song by Lloyd Webber.

=== Cast Recording ===
A cast album, featuring the songs from the original London production, was released as a CD and digital download on 9 May 2011.

== Reception ==
=== Original 2011 London production ===
Opening night reviews were mixed but generally praised the designs, the special effects and several cast members, especially Waddingham. The Telegraph reviewer, Charles Spencer, rated the production three out of five stars, writing: "Jeremy Sams's production pulls out all the stops, with ingenious designs by Robert Jones that skilfully conjure up both the sepia world of Kansas and the lurid colours of Oz. Dorothy's flight to the enchanted land is thrillingly caught with the help of film effects that wouldn't look out of place on Doctor Who and the story is told with clarity and pace", but added that Hope "offers a thoroughly competent rather than an inspired performance" that "lacks the heart-catching vulnerability of the young Judy Garland". Paul Taylor of The Independent gave the show four out of five stars, commenting: "Jeremy Sams's production is a marvel of beguiling narrative fluency and, with Robert Jones's superb designs, of endlessly witty and spectacular visual invention – from the digitally-enhanced hurricane transition to Oz to the skeletally twisted Gothic palace of the Wicked Witch and her totalitarian, helmeted guards." Henry Hitchings of the London Evening Standard also gave the show four out of five stars, praising Jones's "lavish costumes and lovingly conceived sets. ... The story is lucid and well-paced, though the technological wizardry occasionally obscures its inherent magic. ... Danielle Hope ... makes a winning impression. Her performance combines innocence with easy charm, and her voice soars." Although Michael Billington, the reviewer at The Guardian, felt "blitzkrieged rather than charmed", he gave the production three stars out of five, writing:

"The star of the show is undoubtedly the set and costume designer, Robert Jones. The Kansas cyclone that whisks Dorothy into a dreamworld is evoked through vorticist projections (the work of Jon Driscoll) that betoken chaos in the cosmos. The Yellow Brick Road is on a tilted revolve from inside which poppyfields and labyrinthine forest emerge. The Emerald City is full of steeply inclined walls suggesting a drunkard's vision of the Chrysler Building lobby. And the Wicked Witch of the West inhabits a rotating dungeon that might be a Piranesi nightmare. ... Of course, there are the songs; it's good to be reminded of such classics as "Over The Rainbow", "We're Off To See The Wizard", and "Follow The Yellow Brick Road". The additions by Lloyd Webber and Rice are also perfectly acceptable. Dorothy is given a good plaintive opening number, and Red Shoes Blues, sung by the Wicked Witch, has a pounding intensity."

The Oxford Times reviewed the production during Evans's first week (in May 2011) replacing the vacationing Hope, calling the show "hugely enjoyable" and commenting of Evans: "Such is her success in the role that it would be hard to imagine anyone could consider they were getting second-best."

== Awards and nominations ==
=== Original West End production ===
Year	Award	Category	Nominee	Result	Ref
2012	Laurence Olivier Award	Best Musical Revival		Nominated	

=== Original Toronto production ===
Year	Award	Category	Nominee	Result	Ref
2013	Dora Awards	Outstanding Production		Nominated	
2013	Dora Awards	Outstanding Performance - Female	Lisa Horner	Won	
2013	Dora Awards	Outstanding Performance - Male	Cedric Smith	Nominated	
2013	Dora Awards	Outstanding Performance - Ensemble	Cast	Nominated	

== See also ==
- The Wizard of Oz, a 1987 stage musical adaptation of the 1939 film, originally produced by the Royal Shakespeare Company
- Adaptations of The Wonderful Wizard of Oz
- Musical selections in The Wizard of Oz
