= The Wizard of Oz (1939 album) =

1939 studio album by various artists

Studio album by Various artists (Judy Garland with Victor Young and his orchestra)
- Released: 1939
- Recorded: July 28–29, 1939
- Label: Decca

Judy Garland chronology
The Wizard of Oz (1939)	Judy Garland Souvenir Album (1940)

Singles from The Wizard of Oz
- 1. "Over the Rainbow" / "The Jitterbug" Released: 1939

The Wizard of Oz is an album of phonograph records released in 1939 on the Decca label. It featured songs from the Metro-Goldwyn-Mayer motion picture The Wizard of Oz starring Judy Garland.

Made in July 1939 specially for Decca, where Garland was under contract, the album offered the primary recordings of the film's songs until MGM released The Wizard of Oz soundtrack on LP in 1956.

== Recording ==
The recordings the album contained were not taken from the actual movie's soundtrack, they were recorded specially for this album on July 28–29, 1939.

The album included seven songs spread over eight sides. The music was played by the Victor Young Orchestra.

The vocals on "Over the Rainbow" and "The Jitterbug" were sung by Judy Garland. These two are the only songs from The Wizard of Oz that Judy Garland recorded commercially. Moreover, "The Jitterbug" was ultimately cut from the film.

The vocals on "Munchkinland", "If I Only Had a Brain", "If I Only Had a Heart", "The Merry Old Land of Oz", "We're Off to See the Wizard" were sung the Ken Darby Singers. None of the other movie cast members participated in the recording. The spoken part of the Scarecrow in the intro to "The Jitterbug" was performed by Harold Arlen.

== Issues and background ==
Professional ratings
Review scores
Source	Rating
The School Musician	positive
The New Yorker	positive

Professional ratings
The Musical Score of The Wizard of Oz & The Song Hits from Pinocchio
Review scores
Source	Rating
Billboard	85/100

Originally, in 1939, the album was released as a set of four 10-inch 78-rpm shellac records (catalog number: Decca Album 74).

In 1947, it was reissued with a different cover (cat. no.: Decca A-558), also as a set of four 10-inch 78-rpm records.

The film's actual soundtrack recording would not be available on record until late 1956 when it was released on MGM Records to coincide with the first TV broadcast of the motion picture.

At the same time, Decca, too, re-released its album for the TV premiere, now adding a number of songs from Pinocchio to form the 12-inch long-play titled The Musical Score of The Wizard of Oz & The Song Hits from Pinocchio (cat. no.: Decca DL 8387). Billboard reviewed the LP in its issue from 10 November 1956, giving it 85 points out of 100 (which indicated an "excellent" rating) and writing: "M-G-M has produced a sound track version, but this, too, will come in for plenty of attention, in spite of lacking the other original cast artists. Cuttings were made by Decca at the time of the original release of the pic and they have a comparatively high quality of sound, considering. Flip side rates attention, too, with its group of selections, also featuring a much younger Miss Garland on songs from Pinocchio. This one should hold its own in the pre-holiday gift-buying market."

== Track listing ==
4 x 10" 78 rpm (Decca Album 74)

All lyrics are written by E. Y. Harburg; all music is composed by Harold Arlen.

2672 A
No.	Title	Artist	Length
1.	"Over the Rainbow"	Judy Garland with Victor Young and his orchestra

2672 B
No.	Title	Artist	Length
1.	"The Jitterbug"	Judy Garland with Victor Young and his orchestra

2673 A
No.	Title	Artist	Length
1.	"Munchkinland, Part I"	Victor Young and his orchestra. Vocals under the direction of Ken Darby

2673 B
No.	Title	Artist	Length
1.	"Munchkinland, Part II"	Victor Young and his orchestra. Vocals under the direction of Ken Darby

2674 A
No.	Title	Artist	Length
1.	"If I Only Had a Brain"	Victor Young and his orchestra. Vocals under the direction of Ken Darby

2674 B
No.	Title	Artist	Length
1.	"If I Only Had a Heart (If I Only Had the Nerve)"	Victor Young and His Orchestra. Vocals under the direction of Ken Darby

2675 A
No.	Title	Artist	Length
1.	"The Merry Old Land of Oz"	Victor Young and his orchestra. Vocals under the direction of Ken Darby

2675 B
No.	Title	Artist	Length
1.	"We're Off to See the Wizard"	Victor Young and his orchestra. Vocals under the direction of Ken Darby

Notes:

- The "Munchkinland" medley is spread over two sides of one gramophone record.

== See also ==
- Musical selections in The Wizard of Oz
