= The Wizard of Oz in Concert: Dreams Come True =

- Based on: The Wonderful Wizard of Oz by L. Frank Baum The Wizard of Oz by: Noel Langley; Florence Ryerson; Edgar Allan Woolf
- Starring: Jewel; Jackson Browne; Roger Daltrey; Nathan Lane; Joel Grey; Lucie Arnaz; Debra Winger; Natalie Cole
- Narrated by: Joel Grey; Debra Winger
- Music by: Herbert Stothart; Songs: Harold Arlen E. Y. Harburg
- Country of origin: United States
- Original language: English

Original release
- Network: TBS; TNT
- Release: November 22, 1995

The Wizard of Oz in Concert: Dreams Come True is a 1995 television musical performance based on the 1939 film The Wizard of Oz (starring Judy Garland). The book and score of the film were performed on stage at Lincoln Center to benefit the Children's Defense Fund. The concert featured guest performers including Jackson Browne as the Scarecrow, Roger Daltrey as the Tin Man, Natalie Cole as Glinda, Joel Grey as the Wizard (a role he reprised in Wicked), Jewel as Dorothy, Nathan Lane as the Cowardly Lion, Debra Winger as the Wicked Witch, and Lucie Arnaz as Aunt Em. The Boys Choir of Harlem appeared as the Munchkins, and Ry Cooder and David Sanborn performed as musicians.

== Production ==
The production consists of an abbreviated script and highlights most songs and musical numbers from the movie. The most notable difference is Uncle Henry and the three farmhands do not appear in this production, but Joel Grey who narrates the Kansas scenes in his role of Professor Marvel and Debra Winger's "Cyclone" narration both mention Miss Gulch. The concert begins with Jewel as Dorothy Gale singing the complete version of "Over the Rainbow". The concert also includes the song "The Jitterbug", which was cut from the original film.

Throughout the entire concert, the conductor and orchestra are featured on-stage with the performers. The performers are predominantly positioned at music stands reading the script and music (similar to reader's theatre). The choreography is different from the 1939 movie: noticeable differences include the Munchkins not dancing and at no point do the four principals (Dorothy, Scarecrow, Tin Man and Cowardly Lion) dance together. Throughout the production, various pieces of Oz artwork by Charles Santore are projected on a screen in the back of the stage.

Various songs were changed to better feature specific talents of individual singers, including "If I Only Had a Brain", which had a folk music tempo to highlight Jackson Browne and "If I Only Had a Heart", which had a rock and roll tempo to highlight Roger Daltrey (Daltrey even swings his microphone, mimicking his Who persona). This stage adaptation omits the Wicked Witch's scene of threatening Dorothy, Scarecrow and Tin Man while being on top of the Tin Man's wooden cottage following this musical number.

The line about suggesting to the Cowardly Lion to count sheep prior to the musical number "If I Only Had the Nerve" is spoken by Dorothy rather than the Tin Man.

Phoebe Snow added a stirring "If I Only Had..." medley set to a solo piano, combining all three of the Scarecrow, Tin Man, and Cowardly Lion's desires.

Nathan Lane's portrayal of the Lion included a version of "If I Were King of the Forest", in which he adds to the lyrics: "not, queen, not duke, not prince...or the Artist Formerly Known as Prince".

This production shortens the Wicked Witch's Castle scenes due to time limit. The Winkies perform their chant, but appear without being dressed as guards and holding pikes. In the scene where Dorothy (Jewel) suffers her imprisonment after Aunt Em's image fades away in the crystal ball, Winger says the line "What a little whiner! I'll give you something to cry about" which was not spoken by Margaret Hamilton. It omits the scene of the Scarecrow, Tin Man, and Lion rescuing Dorothy and the Witch setting the Scarecrow on fire. It immediately leads into the Wicked Witch's meltdown scene followed by the musical number "Hail! Hail! The Witch is Dead" which was also cut from the original film.

Unlike Jack Haley, Daltrey as the Tin Man hugged the Wizard (Joel Grey) toward the end with a pleasant "Thank you from the bottom of my heart!". The Wizard did not depart from the Emerald City inside a hot-air balloon due to being in the same scene as Glinda the Good Witch.

The production featured an ensemble of background singers. One of them, Julia Murney, would go on to portray Elphaba in Wicked on the National Tour, and later on Broadway.

The performance was originally broadcast November 22 on both TNT and TBS, and issued on CD and VHS video in 1996. The video has not yet been released on DVD. Both the CD and video are currently out-of-print. However it is currently available on YouTube.

== Cast ==
- Jewel as Dorothy Gale
- Joel Grey as Narrator of Kansas/Professor Marvel/Gatekeeper of Emerald City/Coachman with "Horse of a Different Color"/Doorman to Wizard's Palace/ The Wizard
- Jackson Browne as Scarecrow
- Roger Daltrey as Tin Man
- Nathan Lane as Cowardly Lion
- Natalie Cole as Glinda the Good Witch of the North
- Debra Winger as Narrator of Cyclone/Wicked Witch of the West
- Lucie Arnaz as Aunt Em
- James Waller as Toto
- Boys Choir of Harlem, under the musical direction of Dr. Walter J. Turnbull, as The Munchkins
- Alfre Woodard as Hostess
- Phoebe Snow performs medley reprise of "If I Only Had a Brain; a Heart; the Nerve". She also performs in the finale.
- Ronnie Spector performs "Hail, Hail the Witch is Dead" with Dr. John
- Ry Cooder
- Images
- David Sanborn
- Background Singers: Larry J. Alexander, John Anthony, Christy Baron, Jay Kiman, Neal Mayer, Julia K. Murney, Jennifer L. Neuland, Catherine Ruivivar, Stephanie Seeley, Robin Syke, and Tom Treadwell

== Soundtrack ==
=== Track listing ===
1. "Main Title" – Orchestra
2. "Over the Rainbow" – Jewel
3. "Cyclone" – Debra Winger and Orchestra
4. "Come Out, Come Out..." – Natalie Cole and the Boys Choir of Harlem
5. "It Really Was No Miracle" – Jewel and the Boys Choir of Harlem
6. "We Thank You Very Sweetly" – The Boys Choir of Harlem
7. "Ding-Dong! The Witch Is Dead" – Natalie Cole and the Boys Choir of Harlem
8. "As Mayor of the Munchkin City" – Daniel Lane
9. "As Coroner, I Must Aver" – Kevin Miller
10. "Ding-Dong! The Witch Is Dead" – Natalie Cole and the Boys Choir of Harlem
11. "The Lullaby League" – The Boys Choir of Harlem
12. "The Lollipop Guild" – The Boys Choir of Harlem
13. "We Welcome You to Munchkinland" – The Boys Choir of Harlem
14. "Who Killed My Sister" – Debra Winger, Natalie Cole and Jewel
15. "Follow the Yellow Brick Road / You're Off to See the Wizard" – Natalie Cole, Jewel and the Boys Choir of Harlem
16. "If I Only Had a Brain" – Jackson Browne, Jewel, Images, Ry Cooder and David Sanborn
17. "We're Off to See the Wizard" – Jewel, Jackson Browne and Ry Cooder
18. "If I Only Had a Heart" – Roger Daltrey and Female Ensemble
19. "We're Off to See the Wizard" – Jewel, Jackson Browne, Roger Daltrey and Ry Cooder
20. "Lions and Tigers and Bears" – Jewel, Jackson Browne and Roger Daltrey
21. "If I Only Had the Nerve" – Nathan Lane, Jewel, Jackson Browne and Roger Daltrey
22. "We're Off to See the Wizard" – Jewel, Jackson Browne, Roger Daltrey, Nathan Lane and Ry Cooder
23. "If I Only Had a Brain / A Heart / The Nerve (Reprise)" – Phoebe Snow, Keith Levenson and John Miller
24. "Poppies" – Debra Winger and Orchestra
25. "You're Out of the Woods" – Natalie Cole, Dr. John and Female Ensemble
26. "The Merry Old Land of Oz" – Joel Grey and Full Company
27. "Surrender Dorothy" – Jewel, Jackson Browne, Roger Daltrey, Nathan Lane and Joel Grey
28. "If I Were King of the Forest" – Nathan Lane and Full Company
29. "Bring Me the Broomstick" – Joel Grey, Jewel, Jackson Browne, Roger Daltrey and Nathan Lane
30. "Haunted Forest" – Debra Winger
31. "The Jitterbug" – Jewel, Jackson Browne, Roger Daltrey, Nathan Lane and Full Company
32. "March of the Winkies" – Debra Winger and Male Ensemble
33. "Hail, Hail! The Witch Is Dead" – Ronnie Spector, Dr. John, David Sanborn and Images
34. "We Brought You the Broomstick" – Joel Grey, Jewel, Jackson Browne, Roger Daltrey and Nathan Lane
35. "Delirious Escape" – Natalie Cole
36. "Finale (Over the Rainbow)" – Full Company, Lucie Arnaz, Phoebe Snow, Ronnie Spector, Ry Cooder, Dr. John and David Sanborn
37. "Orchestra Finale" – Orchestra

== See also ==
- The Wizard of Oz adaptations
