= Leonard Ceeley =

British actor (1892–1977)

- Born: Leon Otis Dickerson Seeley; 14 August 1892; Gravesend, Kent, England, U.K.
- Died: 7 May 1977 (aged 84); Los Angeles, California, U.S.
- Occupation: actor

Leonard Ceeley (real name Leon Otis Dickerson Seeley; born 14 August 1892 – 7 May 1977) was a British-born American actor.

== Early life and career ==
Ceeley began as a choirboy at Rochester Cathedral before traveling to Italy to refine his vocal skills.

His theatrical career unfolded almost exclusively in the United States, where he was one of the most prolific actors in musicals and operettas during the late 1920s and early 1930s, particularly on the Broadway theatre and around the country.

From 1930 to 1935, Ceeley held many leading roles in productions at the St. Louis Municipal Opera Theatre, commonly known as The Muny, earning his own paper doll.

Ceeley later had a modest film career, with his best-known role as Whitmore, the villain in A Day at the Races opposite the Marx Brothers (1937).

In 1943, Ceeley married Lorraine Bridges an American actress and singer; they remained married until his death in 1977. They were principal players in the pre-filming stage tour for the Marx brothers film A Day at the Races. and appeared in an adaptation of Cyrano de Bergerac titled Gardenia Lady, which was written, composed, produced and costarred by Leonard Ceeley (under the name of Lyn Ceeley), in Leeds in 1947.

== Theatre ==
- 1924 : Lollipop as Don Carlos
- 1927 : My princess; as Guiseppe Ciccolini
- 1928 : Countess Maritza as Count Tassilo Endrody
- 1929 : Café de Danse as Ramon
- 1930: Alone at Last as Baron Franz Von Hansen
- 1930: Blossom Time as Baron Von Schober
- 1930: Nina Rosa as Pablo
- 1930: The New Moon as Phillippe
- 1930: The Desert Song as Pierre Birabeau
- 1930: The Student Prince as Prince Karl Franz
- 1930: Madame Pompadour as Rene Comte d'Estrades
- 1930: Maytime as Rudolpho/Signor Zizalle
- 1930: Show Boat as Steve
- 1931: Countess Maritza as Count Tassilo Endrody
- 1931: The Three Musketeers as D'Artagnan
- 1931: Rose-Marie as Edward Hawley
- 1931: Rio Rita as General Enrique Joselito Esteban
- 1932: The Rose of Stamboul as Achmed Bey
- 1932: The Riviera Girl as Charles Lorenz
- 1932: The New Moon as Phillippe
- 1932: The Desert Song as Pierre Birabeau
- 1932: The Last Waltz as Prince Paul
- 1933: Beau Brummell as Beau Brummell
- 1933: My Maryland as Capt. Trumbull
- 1933: Bitter Sweet as Captain August Lutte
- 1933: Florodora as Cyrus Gilfain
- 1933: Rip Van Winkle (Planquette) as Derrick von Beekman
- 1933: The Desert Song as Pierre Birabeau
- 1933: White Lilacs as Pierre Luselle
- 1933: The Nightingale as Stephen Rutherford
- 1934: Music in the Air as Bruno Mahler
- 1934: Cyrano de Bergerac as Cyrano de Bergerac
- 1934: Sweethearts as Franz
- 1934: Sweet Adeline as James Day
- 1934: The New Moon as Phillippe
- 1934: The Last Waltz as Prince Paul
- 1934: East Wind as Rene Beauvais
- 1934: Show Boat as Steve
- 1937: Music in the Air as Bruno Mahler
- 1940: Unfaithfully yours (du Barry) as Louis XV
- 1943: Balalaika as Colonel Balakirev
- 1950: The New Moon as Phillippe
- 1951: Song of Norway as Franz Liszt
- 1953: Three Wishes for Jamie as Power O'Malley
- 1953: Blossom Time as Count Frederic Scharntoff
- 1953: Call Me Madam as Supreme Court Justice
- 1953: Gentlemen Prefer Blondes as Mr. Esmond
- 1953: The Great Waltz as Hartkopf
- 1953: Music in the Air as Herr Direktor Kirschner
- 1953: The Mikado as Go-To
- 1953: Naughty Marietta as Lieut. Governor Grandet
- 1953: The Boy Friend; as Percival Browne (understudy)

== Filmography ==
- 1936 : Moonlight Murder : Ivan Bosloff
- 1937 : A Day at the Races : Whitmore
- 1937 : The Soldier and the Lady : Tsar's aide (uncredited)

== Television ==
- 1950 : first Believe It or Not TV series (TV series).

== External sources ==
- Leonard Ceeley at Playbill Vault
- Leonard Ceeley at the American Film Institute Catalog
- Leonard Ceeley at the Internet Broadway Database
- Leonard Ceeley in The Muny Archive
- Leonard Ceeley sur About The Artists
