= Twoo =

TWOO or Twoo may refer to:

- The Wizard of Oz (disambiguation)
- Twoo.com, a matchmaking service whose parent company was bought by Meetic Group
