= The Wonderful Wizard of Oz (disambiguation) =

The Wonderful Wizard of Oz is a fantasy novel written by L. Frank Baum.

The Wonderful Wizard of Oz may also refer to:

- The Wonderful Wizard of Oz (1910 film), the earliest surviving film adaptation of Baum's book
- The Wonderful Wizard of Oz (TV series), a 1986–1987 Japanese anime adaptation of four of Baum's books
- The Wonderful Wizard of Oz (musical), a 2000 musical play based on the novel
- The Wonderful Wizard of Oz (2005 graphic novel), written by David Chauvel with art by Enrique Fernandez
- The Wonderful Wizard of Oz (2009 comics), an eight-issue limited series by Marvel Comics

== See also ==
- Adaptations of The Wonderful Wizard of Oz
- The Wonderful Wizard of Ha's, a VeggieTales film
- The Wizard of Oz (disambiguation)
