= Jonny Fines =

English actor, singer and dancer

- Born: Jonathan Fines; 16 September 1987 (age 38); Loughborough, England
- Education: Guildford School of Acting
- Occupation: Actor
- Years active: 2010-present
- Children: 1
- Website: jonnyfines.com

Jonny Fines (born 16 September 1987) is an English actor, singer and dancer, best known for his work in television and musical theatre.

Fines grew up in the town of Loughborough, Leicestershire, England. He graduated from the Guildford School of Acting in 2010 and has subsequently appeared in a wide variety of roles in theatre and television. As well as UK-wide tours, he has also performed in foreign productions. He made his professional West End debut at the Piccadilly Theatre in London in 2017.

His roles include Zack Mayo in the 2018 UK tour of An Officer and a Gentleman: The Musical and Rooster Hannigan in the 2017 UK tour of Annie alongside Craig Revel Horwood, Lesley Joseph and Meera Syal. Fines continued playing the character for a further year, with Miranda Hart playing the sister of his character, when the production moved to the West End.

Jonny appeared, in character, live on UK television during the BBC's Children in Need event in 2017 performing the song Easy Street from the musical Annie alongside his partner Djalenga Scott who was heavily pregnant at the time with their first child.

He appeared on UK television in the long-running Channel 4 soap opera Hollyoaks in 2019 playing the recurring character of Officer Turley. It was announced in April 2019 that Fines would be returning to the Curve Theatre, Leicester in September to take part in a theatrical version of the 1985 comedy-drama film, My Beautiful Laundrette. The production then began a limited-run UK tour ending in Birmingham in November 2019.

Jonny has gone on to appear in Coronation Street playing estate agent Jim Stentson. More recently, Jonny can be seen in EastEnders as PC English.

== Selected credits ==
Year	Title	Role	Venue
2019	My Beautiful Laundrette	Johnny	UK Tour
2018	An Officer and a Gentleman: The Musical	Zack Mayo	UK Tour
2017	Annie	Rooster Hannigan	Piccadilly Theatre, London
2016	Grease: The Musical	Kennickie Murdoch	Curve Theatre, Leicester
2015	Annie	Rooster Hannigan	UK Tour
2014	Altar Boyz	Mark	Greenwich Theatre, London
2013	Carnival of the Animals	Mono	Riverside Studios, Hammersmith
2013	Lift	Gabrielle	Soho Theatre, London
2012	Avenue Q	Nicky/Trekkie Monster	UK Tour
2011	I Love You, You're Perfect, Now Change	Man1	Union Theatre, London
2010	The Sound of Music	Rolf	UK Tour
2022	The Wizard of Oz	Hunk / The Scarecrow	Curve Theatre, Leicester
