= Musical selections in The Wizard of Oz =

Songs from the 1939 film The Wizard of Oz

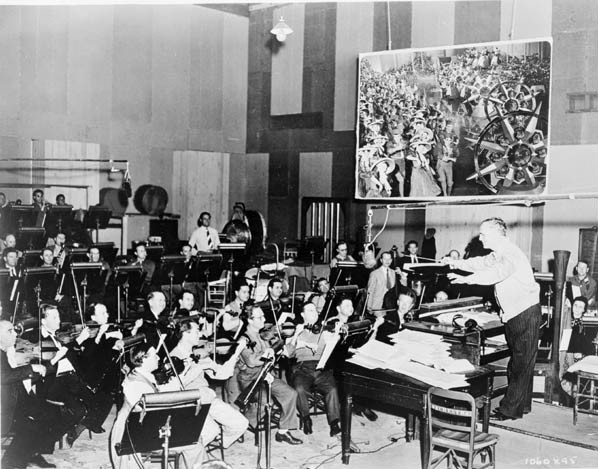
Herbert Stothart conducts the MGM Studio Orchestra in scoring sessions for The Wizard of Oz

The 1939 musical fantasy film The Wizard of Oz features several well-known songs. Its principal number, “Over the Rainbow,” written by Harold Arlen (music) and E.Y. “Yip” Harburg (lyrics), won the Academy Award for Best Original Song. The song has since been widely covered and has ranked highly on lists of notable film songs, including the American Film Institute’s “100 Years…100 Songs.”

Herbert Stothart, who adapted the music for the screen, won the Academy Award for Best Original Score for The Wizard of Oz. Georgie Stoll was the associate conductor and screen credits were given to George Bassman, Murray Cutter (who did "Over the Rainbow"), Ken Darby and Paul Marquardt for orchestral and vocal arrangements. As usual, Roger Edens was heavily involved as the unbilled musical associate of Arthur Freed. Incidental music was contributed by Stoll, Bassman, Robert Stringer and also Conrad Salinger. The music to "Optimistic Voices" was written by Arlen and Stothart.

Herbert Stothart conducted the MGM Studio Orchestra in scoring sessions for The Wizard of Oz. The songs were recorded with a full orchestra on the MGM scoring stage before filming. Several of the recordings were completed while Buddy Ebsen, who was supposed to have played the Tin Man, was still with the cast. So while he had to be dropped from the cast due to illness from the aluminum powder makeup, his singing voice remains on the soundtrack. It is Jack Haley, who eventually played the role, that is seen and heard singing "If I Only Had A Heart", but Ebsen's voice is still heard on the group vocals of "We're Off To See The Wizard". In those vocals, his voice is easy to detect. Ray Bolger (and also Jack Haley) were speakers with a distinct Boston accent and did not pronounce the r in wizard. Buddy Ebsen was a Midwesterner, like Judy Garland, and pronounced the r.

Although an orchestra underscores nearly the entire film, approximately the last third of the movie contains no songs. Once Dorothy and her cohorts are handed the task of killing the Wicked Witch, the mood of the film goes a bit darker. This was not originally intended—the last three songs in the film, "The Jitterbug," the vocal reprise of "Over The Rainbow," and "The Triumphant Return" were all excised from the film before its official release.

== Music in the film ==
=== Songs ===
All lyrics are written by E. Y. Harburg; all music is composed by Harold Arlen.

No.	Title	Performer(s)	Length
1.	"Over the Rainbow"	Judy Garland
2.	"Come Out, Come Out, Wherever You Are"	Billie Burke & The Munchkin Chorus
3.	"It Really Was No Miracle"	Judy Garland, Billy Bletcher & The Munchkin Chorus
4.	"We Thank You Very Sweetly"	Joseph Koziel & Frank Cucksey
5.	"Ding-Dong! The Witch Is Dead"	The Munchkin Chorus
6.	"As Mayor of the Munchkin City"	Billy Bletcher, Pinto Colvig & J. D. Jewkes
7.	"As Coroner, I Must Aver"	Harry Stanton
8.	"Ding-Dong! The Witch Is Dead (Reprise)"	The Munchkin Chorus
9.	"The Lullaby League"	Lorraine Bridges, Betty Rome & Carol Tevis
10.	"The Lollipop Guild"	Billy Bletcher, Pinto Colvig & Harry Stanton
11.	"We Welcome You to Munchkinland"	The Munchkin Chorus
12.	"Follow the Yellow Brick Road"	Judy Garland & The Munchkin Chorus
13.	"If I Only Had a Brain"	Ray Bolger & Judy Garland
14.	"We're Off to See the Wizard"	Judy Garland & Ray Bolger
15.	"If I Only Had a Heart"	Jack Haley & Adriana Caselotti
16.	"We're Off to See the Wizard (Reprise)"	Judy Garland, Ray Bolger & Buddy Ebsen
17.	"If I Only Had the Nerve"	Bert Lahr, Jack Haley, Judy Garland & Ray Bolger
18.	"We're Off to See the Wizard (Reprise 2)"	Judy Garland, Ray Bolger, Buddy Ebsen & Bert Lahr
19.	"Optimistic Voices"	The Debutantes & The Rhythmettes
20.	"The Merry Old Land of Oz"	Frank Morgan, Judy Garland, Ray Bolger, Jack Haley, Bert Lahr, Tyler Brooke, Ralph Sudam, Bobby Watson, Oliver Smith, Charles Irwin, Lois January, Elvida Rizzo, Lorraine Bridges & Chorus
21.	"If I Were King of the Forest"	Bert Lahr
22.	"The Jitterbug" (outtake)	Judy Garland, Ray Bolger, Jack Haley & Bert Lahr
23.	"Over the Rainbow (Reprise)" (outtake)	Judy Garland
24.	"Hail! Hail! The Witch Is Dead!" (outtake)	Ken Darby & MGM Studio Chorus

"The Jitterbug", "Over the Rainbow (Reprise)", and "Hail! Hail! the Witch Is Dead!", were all cut from the final film. A brief moment from "Hail! Hail! the Witch Is Dead!" can be seen in the 1949 re-release trailer for the film. "If I Were King of the Forest" does not appear in the immersive 4D version of the film created in 2025 to screen at Sphere in the Las Vegas Valley due to the film's runtime being shortened.

=== Instrumentals ===
- In addition to the well-known vocals by Harburg and Arlen, nearly the entire film was underscored by arranger Herbert Stothart, using a mixture of instrumental-only leitmotifs composed for some of the characters, instrumental references to some of the vocals, and traditional and classical pieces. Much of the following information (which is by no means an exhaustive list) is taken from the Deluxe CD liner notes.

=== Composed for the film ===
- Opening credits medley: Glinda's theme (The Good Fairy Vanishes), dynamic full-orchestra version, played over the MGM Leo the Lion logo; followed by segments of "Ding, Dong, the Witch is Dead" played slowly and majestically, so that the song is almost unrecognizable; they lead into a triumphant, full-orchestra version of "Over the Rainbow", then we hear "It Really Was No Miracle", a triumphant version of "Come Out, Come Out, Wherever You Are", and "It Really Was No Miracle" again, followed by original music while the film's foreword appears on the screen.
- Miss Gulch's / Witch's theme – repeated every time Miss Gulch or the witch appears. This repeated seven-note motif is actually a "crippled" variation (inverted and compressed in range) of the musical figure for "We're Off to See the Wizard".
- Orientale theme – for Professor Marvel and for The Wizard
- Glinda's theme (aka "The Good Fairy Vanishes") – 6-note pattern repeated several times rapidly each time Glinda arrives or leaves in her bubble: G, D, E, B-flat, G, C-sharp.
- March of the Winkies – Five-note chant of “O-Ee-Yah! Eoh-Ah!” performed by the Winkie Guards. The nonsensical lyrics have been the subject of misinterpretation over the years, even thought by some to be a plug for Oreo cookies. It was later sampled by several popular music artists including Metallica (“The Frayed Ends of Sanity”), LL Cool J (“I'm That Type of Guy”), and Prince (“It’s Gonna Be a Beautiful Night”).
- Closing credits medley: Glinda's theme (full orchestra) / Over the Rainbow

=== Not composed specifically for the film ===
- "The Happy Farmer", i.e. Fröhlicher Landmann, von der Arbeit zurückkehrend, "The Happy Farmer Returning from Work" from Schumann's Album for the Young – opening scene, establishing scenes in Kansas, and during "ride" in cyclone
- "My Castle's in the Courtyard" (nursery rhyme) – in sequence leading up to "Over the Rainbow"
- "The Whistler and His Dog" (by Septimus Winner) a.k.a. "Oh Where, Oh Where Has My Little Dog Gone?" – when Toto escapes from Miss Gulch's basket as she pedals on her bicycle to the sheriff
- "In the Shade of the Old Apple Tree" (by Harry Williams and Egbert Van Alstyne) – when Dorothy and the Scarecrow find themselves in an apple orchard
- "Brahms' Lullaby" - when Dorothy and the Lion fall asleep in the poppy field
- Scherzo Opus 16 #2 (by Mendelssohn) – when Toto escapes from the castle
- "Night on Bald Mountain" (by Mussorgsky) – during chase scenes at the witch's castle
- "Gaudeamus Igitur" (traditional) – a few bars when the Wizard awards the Scarecrow his honorary degree
- "Home! Sweet Home!" (by John Howard Payne and Henry Bishop) – as Dorothy says the words and clicks her heels, and in the final scene in Kansas. In the final moments of this scene, a horn intones "Home Sweet Home" in counterpoint to the final strain of "Over The Rainbow."

== Song previews ==
Most of the songs were first heard on radio on a fifteen-minute program called MGM: Leo Is On the Air a few months prior to the film's release. In what must have been an extremely unusual step at the time, the actual soundtrack versions of the songs were used. Brunswick Records had earlier recorded a single of "Over the Rainbow" as well as "The Jitterbug", a song eventually deleted from the film, but MGM had suppressed the recording because they wanted to preview the songs themselves. The radio preview proved a huge success and, through repeated live radio playings, "Over the Rainbow" soared to the top of the hit parade charts even before audiences saw the film. An obviously staged "backstage glimpse" at the planning and making of the film, hosted by Robert Young, and featuring Judy Garland, Frank Morgan, lyricist E.Y. Harburg, and composer Harold Arlen, was the subject of an episode of the Good News of 1939 radio program. This program also gave a sneak preview of some of the music, but interspersed it with comedy skits by such artists as Fannie Brice. Brice, in her radio persona of Baby Snooks, was featured in a skit in which Lancelot Higgins (Hanley Stafford) tried to tell her the story of The Wizard of Oz, but was constantly interrupted and almost kept from attending the film's premiere by the toddler, who virtually forced him into taking her along. The entire program, as well as the Leo is On the Air episode, is included as a supplement on the Wizard of Oz DVD.

== Albums ==
=== 1939 Decca studio album ===
The first record album of music from the film was not a soundtrack album in the sense that the term is used today, or even an original cast album, although it is sometimes erroneously called so. It was, instead, a U.S. Decca four-record 78 rpm studio cast album of songs from the film released in 1939, featuring Judy Garland as Dorothy but with the Ken Darby Singers in other roles. Darby had also been one of the film's music arrangers, but the arrangements made for the film were not used in this album. This album was about twenty minutes long. There was no overture or finale included, and most of the songs were not placed in the same order that they were heard in the film. The album also used some introductory song verses which had not been included in the motion picture and were not used in the MGM radio previews. Two songs heard in the film as finally released were omitted from the album—"Optimistic Voices" and "If I Were King of the Forest"; however, the album did include the song "The Jitterbug", which had been deleted from the film. It also used, oddly enough, dialogue which never appeared in the movie; at one point, during "The Merry Old Land of Oz", Dorothy says, "We can't go to see the Wizard like this! We're all dirty!", after which the group supposedly enters the Wash and Brush Up room in the Emerald City. The reprise of "Over the Rainbow" and the "Triumphal Return" sequence were also not included.

The orchestra on the album was conducted by Victor Young. In the "Munchkinland" medley, the Ken Darby Singers provided the voices of the Munchkins, but they were not altered to sound "chipmunk"-like, as in the film. The role of Glinda was sung by an unnamed soprano with an operatic voice, the solo part in "If I Only Had a Brain" was performed by composer Harold Arlen, and in the song "If I Only Had a Heart", the role of the Tin Man was sung by a tenor whose voice bordered on falsetto. The two songs Garland sang on the album, "Over the Rainbow" and "The Jitterbug," had already been released as a 78-rpm single in 1939 only a month after the film's premiere, on a single that had nothing to do with the Brunswick Records recording released by MGM, and were incorporated into the 1939 album.

On the rest of the 1939 album, an unnamed soloist took the role of Dorothy.

This album was quite a success, and after being reissued in a 45-rpm version and as a 10-inch LP, it was finally re-released in 1956 as one side of a 12-inch 33 1/3 rpm LP, the other side occupied by cover versions of songs from Disney's Pinocchio (1940), with Cliff Edwards, the film's Jiminy Cricket, as lead soloist. This is also the year that MGM Records first released an authentic soundtrack album of The Wizard of Oz.

The 1939 Decca "cover album" stayed in print throughout the 1950s, even after MGM Records' authentic soundtrack album of The Wizard of Oz was released. Judy Garland's 1939 cover versions of "Over the Rainbow" and "The Jitterbug" were released years later on the 1994 Decca box set The Complete Decca Masters (plus), which featured all of Garland's Decca singles and several alternate takes. The Decca single of "Over the Rainbow" has been released on an MCA compact disc entitled 20th Century Masters – The Millennium Collection – The Best of Judy Garland, among various other compilations; the entire album was scheduled to be released on CD for the first time in 2014, as part of a 75th anniversary Wizard of Oz collection.

=== 1956 MGM soundtrack album ===
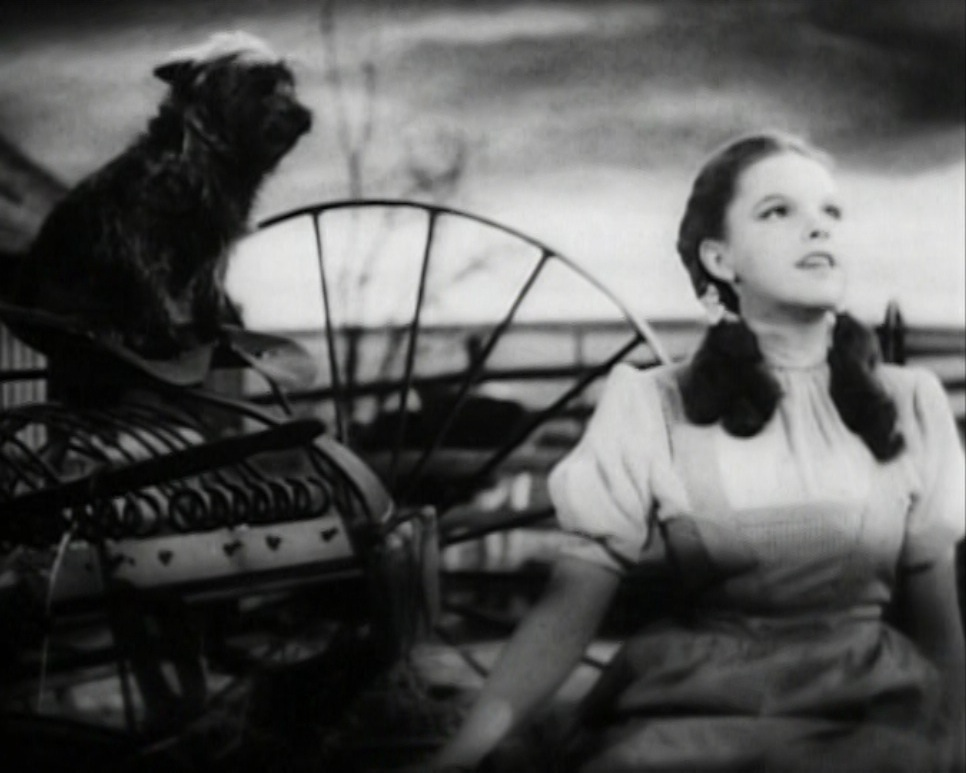
The Wizard of Oz star Judy Garland, (pictured right with cairn terrier Terry) singing her hit "Over the Rainbow" in the film.

In 1956 – the year that the film was first shown on TV – MGM Records released their own authentic 40-minute LP soundtrack album from the film. This album featured not only most of the songs, but also enough dialogue for listeners to be able to follow the story, almost exactly as heard on the movie soundtrack. There were a few minor revisions in this 1956 edition, i.e. Aunt Em's two lines "Dorothy, please, we're trying to count!" (referring to their farm chickens) and "Dorothy, Dorothy, we're busy!" were turned into the single line "Dorothy, Dorothy, we're busy! Please, we're trying to count!". The songs "Optimistic Voices" and "The Merry Old Land of Oz", and the Tin Man's instrumental dance to "If I Only Had a Heart", were omitted from the LP release; also gone were half of the orchestral main title music, half of the "Munchkinland" medley, the entire Professor Marvel sequence, the moments during the tornado scene during which Dorothy sees people – including Miss Gulch – flying past her window, the talking apple trees scene, the appearance of the witch on the roof of the Tin Man's cottage, the poppy field sequence, the moment when the Lion reads "Surrender Dorothy" in the sky, and the scene in the Haunted Forest in which the Tin Man is mysteriously lifted into the air. Also gone was the moment in which the Scarecrow says, "They tore my legs off, and they threw them over there", and the Tin Man answers, "Well, that's you all over", and the scene in which Dorothy's friends are scaling the cliff to get to the witch's castle, as well as many other tiny bits from the film. Perhaps most interesting was the total elimination of any reference to the Ruby Slippers, a very significant and pivotal part of the film.

This soundtrack recording eventually supplanted the 1939 Decca studio album. Throughout the 1960s, 1970s, and 1980s, it was constantly reprinted and re-released (each time with different cover art), and the album eventually appeared in an expanded version on CD in 1989, released by CBS Records instead of MGM. The 1989 release also contained the original deleted film version of "The Jitterbug", albeit without its full intro, as a bonus track. In 1998, to coincide with a digitally restored and remastered theatrical reissue, the album was reissued on Rhino Records as The Songs and Story of the Wizard of Oz. The album was edited from the digital stereo soundtrack of the film's 1998 re-release, created from surviving multiple recording stems, and as such was the first album to feature many of the songs in stereo sound.

=== 1963 MGM studio album ===
In 1963, MGM Records issued an entirely new LP recording featuring four selections from The Wizard of Oz, this one a true cover version with none of the film's cast. Also included on the album were selections from Victor Herbert's Babes in Toyland. This album quickly sank into obscurity and has never been issued on CD. It featured such artists as Jackson Beck.

=== 1995 Rhino Records deluxe soundtrack album ===
In 1995, all previous albums of The Wizard of Oz were supplanted by Rhino Records' extensive, new 2-CD soundtrack album featuring not only all the songs, but also all of Herbert Stothart's background music, as well as outtake pieces of music, the opening and closing credits music, all of the songs cut from the film following its sneak previews, and demos for the songs. In all, this album played for well over two hours, longer than the actual film. All of the songs and music, except for the demos, were presented in the exact order that they would have been heard in the film had it not been slightly trimmed before release.

The 1995 album contains no spoken dialogue. One vocal not heard on the album is the Winkies' chanting of "O – Ee– Oh! Yeoo – Oh!" outside the Wicked Witch's castle, since only the instrumental music track is included. Also unheard is the "Lions and tigers and bears!" chant. Another oddity is that although a full track of the "Cyclone" instrumental is used, in lieu of the film's shortened soundtrack which has an audible edit, only one of the two tracks for the segment was located, so the mix is different from the "normal" version.

A single-disc version was also produced, containing only the vocal selections, the main title, the "Cyclone" instrumental, and the score for the final scene where Dorothy goes home. The single-disc still contained all of the vocal outtakes, with the exception of the "Over The Rainbow" reprise, and extended versions of songs but discarded almost all of the background score. Despite the existence of multi-track recordings, which had been made to create a more full and balanced monaural track for the film, none of the music on either release was mixed in stereo.

=== Other studio cast albums ===
Many other studio cast albums of the songs from the film (aside from the 1939 and 1963 ones) have appeared over the past fifty years, most of them fairly obscure and never issued on compact disc. Golden Records released a seven-minute 45-rpm album of the story with four songs from the film, narrated by Art Carney. The music was sung and played by the Mitch Miller Chorus and Orchestra.

In 1998, when the film received a complete digital video and audio restoration, including a new stereo mix, Rhino Records released The Songs and Story of "The Wizard of Oz", which expanded the 1956 MGM album even further, taking out "The Jitterbug", adding the deleted dance music from "If I Only Had a Brain", and including additional bits of dialogue absent from previous releases. This was also the first time that the Oz songs were made available on CD in stereo, some in simulated stereo, and some in true stereo thanks to the existence of most of MGM's original multi-track recordings of the music from the film.

In 2025, the re-recorded score for The Wizard of Oz at Sphere was released digitally by WaterTower Music. It includes a previously unheard a cappella version of Judy Garland singing "Over the Rainbow," and binaural versions of "Cyclone" and the "I am Oz" scene incorporating the sound design of the Sphere presentation.

== See also ==
- Stage musicals using most of the songs from the film:
  - The Wizard of Oz (1942 musical)
  - The Wizard of Oz (1987 musical)
  - The Wizard of Oz (2011 musical)
