= Frank Cucksey =

America actor, singer, and circus performer (1919–1984)

- Born: Francis Henry Cucksey; January 5, 1919; Brooklyn, New York, U.S.
- Died: September 16, 1984 (aged 65); Sarasota, Florida, U.S.
- Other name: "Cookie"
- Occupations: Actor; singer; circus performer
- Height: 4 ft 5 in (135 cm)
- Spouse: Anna Mitchell

Francis "Frank" "Cookie" Cucksey (January 5, 1919 – September 16, 1984) was an American actor, singer, and circus performer, best known for his role as a Munchkin in the 1939 film The Wizard of Oz.

== Early life and family ==
Francis Henry Cucksey was born in Brooklyn, New York City on January 5, 1919, the son of Charles Cucksey and Helen Cramer. Cucksey was born with dwarfism and was 4 feet and 5 inches (135 cm) tall.

He married Anna "Ann" Mitchell Sholter (a fellow stage performer with dwarfism) on December 19, 1950, in Prince Albert, Saskatchewan, Canada. Their marriage was covered in Billboard magazine.

== Career ==
In the 1930s and 1940s, Cucksey worked as a performer at various night clubs as well as in uncredited roles in film and television. Cucksey was cast in the 1939 MGM film The Wizard of Oz by Leo Singer, the proprietor of Singer's Midgets. During the film, Cucksey portrayed a Munchkin townsperson/villager that gave Dorothy Gale (played by Judy Garland) some flowers. Notably, he was one of the two Munchkin actors whose actual voices were used for Munchkin dialogue during the film (the rest were created by studio voices recorded at a slow speed).

He is credited as one of the two singers of the song "We Thank You Very Sweetly" in the Munchkinland Musical Sequence of the film's soundtrack, as he recited the famous line "You've killed her so completely, that we thank you very sweetly" as an introduction to Ding-Dong! The Witch Is Dead.

In 1941, Cucksey was a member of the original Broadway cast of the musical revue, "Crazy with the Heat." In 1949, Cucksey was a singer in the cast of the national touring show, the "Hollywood Midget Movie Stars Revue" which sold-out to audiences across the country and held performances for several years.

Beginning in the late 1940s, Cucksey worked as a performer, tour guide, and host/ringmaster for the Ringling Bros. and Barnum & Bailey Circus and Circus Hall of Fame, with the billing name of "Cookie Cucksey." Alongside his wife Anna, Cucksey was also a touring performer with the Strates Shows in the 1950s, including performances at Madison Square Garden.

For over 25 years, Cucksey also worked as a fire department dispatcher and volunteer fire department captain for the South Trail Fire District in Sarasota, Florida. Because he worked without pay, he was offered to live at the department for free. He retired from his role in 1978 with the honorary title of deputy chief.

In his later life, he appeared at Wizard of Oz events and provided interviews along with several of the other surviving actors who portrayed Munchkins in the film.

== Death and legacy ==
He died on September 16, 1984, in Sarasota, Florida at the age of 65. He is buried at Palms Memorial Park in Sarasota.

On November 20, 2007, the Munchkin actors were collectively given a star on the Hollywood Walk of Fame.
