= It's Great to Be Alive (film) =

1933 film

- Directed by: Alfred L. Werker
- Written by: Arthur Kober; Paul Perez
- Based on: "The Last Man on Earth"; 1923 novelette in Munsey's Magazine by John D. Swain
- Starring: Raul Roulien; Gloria Stuart; Edna May Oliver; Herbert Mundin; Joan Marsh
- Cinematography: Robert H. Planck
- Edited by: Barney Wolf
- Distributed by: Fox Film Corporation
- Release date: July 8, 1933
- Running time: 69 minutes
- Country: United States

It's Great to Be Alive (1933) is an American Pre-Code science fiction musical comedy film produced by Fox Film Corporation, is a remake of The Last Man on Earth (1924), and later influenced the novel Mr. Adam (1946) by Pat Frank.

== Plot ==
A young aviator, Carlos Martin, is dumped by his girlfriend, and heads on a solo flight across the Pacific Ocean. He has engine trouble and makes an emergency landing on an uninhabited island out in the Pacific. Shortly afterward, a pandemic of a new disease called "masculitis" kills every fertile male human on the planet. When efforts to cure the disease fail, the human race is doomed. Humanity's institutions are all run by women, including the Chicago underworld. Carlos escapes the island, and once he returns home and hears the news, it now depends on him to continue the human race.

== Cast ==
- Raul Roulien as Carlos Martin
- Edna Mae Oliver as Dr. Prodwell
- Gloria Stuart as Dorothy Wilton
- Herbert Mundin as Brooks
- Joan Marsh as Toots
- Dorothy Burgess as Al Moran
- Emma Dunn as Mrs. Wilton
- Edward Van Sloan as Dr. Wilton
- Robert Greig as Perkins
- Lorraine Bridges as Singer
- Peaches Jackson as Dancer, Cuban Girl
- Claire Rochelle as Dancer, Dutch Girl'
- Alexander Schonberg as Einstein Look-a- Like

== Production ==
The film was shot during April 1933, with location scenes photographed at the Grand Central Airport in Glendale, California.

Other cast members include Edna May Oliver, Joan Marsh, Edward Van Sloan, and Peaches Jackson.

A sequence depicts look-alikes of the two top scientists of the era, Albert Einstein and Auguste Piccard, trying to find a cure for masculitis. The actor who was the Einstein look-alike was Alexander Schonberg . Another scene portrays a burlesque show dubbed "Girls of all Nations".
