= Frank Gabrielson =

American dramatist (1910–1980)

Frank Gabrielson (March 13, 1910 – January 24, 1980) was an American stage, film, and television writer. He was born in New York City, New York. His stage work includes The Wizard of Oz as adapted in 1942 for The Muny, Days of Our Youth, also performed as The Bo Tree and Most Likely to Succeed (1939) and The Great Whitewash, also known as The More the Merrier, co-written with Irvin Pincus, (1941). He was also contributed to Jerome Moross's revue, Parade (1935).

Screenwriting credits include Something for the Boys (1944), Don Juan Quilligan (1945), It Shouldn't Happen to a Dog (1946), and Flight of the Doves (1971).

His television work includes Leave It to Beaver, National Velvet, Mama, The Real McCoys, Suspense, and Alfred Hitchcock Presents, among others. He wrote several episodes of Shirley Temple's Storybook, including The Land of Oz episode.

Gabrielson was married to actress Franc Hale. He died in 1980.

== Selected filmography ==
- It Shouldn't Happen to a Dog (1946)
