= Lorraine Bridges =

American actress and singer

Lorraine Bridges (August 17, 1906 – December 4, 1993) was an American actress and singer who was known for her ability to hit high notes.

Bridges was a native of Oklahoma, where she was a singer for radio station WKY early in her career.

Bridges was a contract player at Paramount; the studio dropped her in 1935. She was signed by MGM three weeks later.

Bridges performed as a vocal stand-in, often uncredited, for actresses in popular films such as for BIllie Burke in The Wizard of Oz (1939) and Jeanette MacDonald in New Moon (1940), Bitter Sweet (1940), and Smiling Through (1941).

Bridges also performed on stage, including with the St. Louis Municipal Opera in the 1942 season. She had a show at The Palace in New York in 1951. A Variety review of her show described her as "a fine lyric soprano whose voice occasionally achieves the qualities of a coloratura". She married Leonard Ceeley in 1943. They were principal players in the Marx brothers revue A Day at the Races.

She appeared in a number of shows in England, including an adaptation of Cyrano de Bergerac titled Gardenia Lady, which was written, composed, produced by and costarred her husband Leonard Ceeley, in Leeds in 1947.

Her husband, Leonard Ceeley, died in 1977.

== Filmography ==
- It's Great to Be Alive (1933) as Singer (uncredited)
- Wagon Wheels (1934) as Singer ("Estrelita")
- Escapade (1935) as Singer ('You're All I Need')
- A Night at the Opera as Louisa (1935) (uncredited)
- Swiss Miss (1938) as Chambermaid (uncredited)
- The Wizard of Oz (1939) as Ozmite / Lullaby League Member / Glinda (voice, uncredited)
- New Moon (1940) (vocal stand-in - uncredited)
- Bitter Sweet (1940) (vocal stand-in: Jeanette MacDonald)
- Kiss the Boys Goodbye (1941) (uncredited)
- Smilin' Through (1941) (voice double: Jeanette MacDonald)
- The Chocolate Soldier (1941) in Solo Bit in 'Thank the Lord the War is Over' number (uncredited)
- Rio Rita (1942) (vocal stand-in: Kathryn Grayson)
- Cairo (1942) (vocal stand-in: Jeanette MacDonald)
- Seven Sweethearts (1942) in Specialty Bit in "Little Tingle Tangle Toes" number (uncredited)
