= The Wonderful Wizard of Oz (2005 graphic novel) =

Collection of three stories set in the Wizard of Oz universe

- Cover art for The Wonderful Wizard of Oz
- Author: L. Frank Baum, David Chauvel
- Original title: Le Magicien d'Oz
- Working title: The Wonderful Wizard of Oz
- Translator: Kat Amano
- Illustrator: Enrique Fernandez
- Cover artist: Enrique Fernandez
- Language: French
- Genre: Fantasy
- Publisher: Delcourt, Image Comics
- Publication date: 2005
- Publication place: France
- English publication date: 2007
- Pages: 96
- ISBN: 1582407150

The Wonderful Wizard of Oz (2005) is a collection of three stories adapting the novel The Wonderful Wizard of Oz (1900) by L. Frank Baum. The stories were written by David Chauvel with art by Enrique Fernandez.

The books were first published in French by Delcourt (2005) as Le Magicien d'Oz, continuing Delcourt Jeunesse's theme of adapting classic works in a graphic novel format. The album in English was published in the United States by Image Comics, on January 2, 2007. The three-part book received the Grand Prix de La Ville de Lyon award for illustration in 2005.

Its art inspired American artists Skottie Young's design for the adaptation he made in 2009 for Marvel Comics, with Fernandez sharing that Young said he had Fernandez's comics on the desk while working on his own designs.
