= John Kane (writer) =

British actor and writer (born 1945)

- Born: 27 October 1945 (age 80); Dundee, Angus, Scotland
- Occupations: Actor, writer
- Notable work: Doctor Who: Planet of the Spiders

John Kane (born 27 October 1945) is a British actor and writer.

== Career ==
An associate actor with the Royal Shakespeare Company, Kane played Puck in Peter Brook's acclaimed production of A Midsummer Night's Dream alongside Ben Kingsley, Alan Howard, Patrick Stewart and Frances de la Tour, before turning to comedy scriptwriting. He began writing for Terry Scott's sketch show Scott On, before taking over the reins on a project for Terry Scott and comic actress June Whitfield, which began as Happy Ever After and later turned into the longer-running series Terry and June, for which he wrote the entire first series and much of the subsequent run. His TV acting credits include Tommy—an adult with learning difficulties—in the 1974 Doctor Who serial Planet of the Spiders.

Continuing to work as an actor with the RSC, Kane also created sitcoms Me and My Girl (1984–88) with Richard O'Sullivan and Tim Brooke-Taylor, All in Good Faith (1985–88) with Richard Briers and Aztec drama The Feathered Serpent (1976–78). He also wrote for, among others, Never the Twain, Smuggler, Rings on Their Fingers and wrote the "Six Napoleons" episode of The Adventures of Sherlock Holmes, with Jeremy Brett in the title role.

Turning to the stage, Kane wrote the RSC's adaptation of Wizard of Oz, West End Cole Porter tribute A Swell Party and the words and music in 2005 for The Canterville Ghost at the Southwark Playhouse. He also wrote the television film The Vamp starring Shelley Winters, children's cartoon Britt Allcroft's Magic Adventures of Mumfie, and won a CableACE Award for his screenplay Daisies in December starring Joss Ackland. He collaborated with composer David Bass on a children's opera Kids Court which was performed in Cambridge, Massachusetts in 2007, 2015 and 2025 by the North Cambridge Family Opera Company. He continues to work as a stage and screen actor.
