= Ding-Dong! The Witch Is Dead =

1939 song

"Ding-Dong! The Witch Is Dead" is a song in the 1939 film The Wizard of Oz. It is the centerpiece of several individual songs in an extended set-piece performed by the Munchkins, Glinda (Billie Burke) and Dorothy Gale (Judy Garland) highlighted by a chorus of Munchkin girls (the Lullaby League) and one of Munchkin boys (the Lollipop Guild), it was also sung by studio singers as well as by sung by the Winkie soldiers. It was composed by Harold Arlen, with the lyrics written by E. Y. Harburg. The group of songs celebrate the death of the Wicked Witch of the East when Dorothy's house is dropped on her by the cyclone.

In 2004 a remix of "Ding-Dong! The Witch is Dead" finished at #82 in AFI's 100 Years...100 Songs survey of the top tunes in American cinema. In 2013, the song charted at #2 on the UK singles chart in the aftermath of the death of former Prime Minister Margaret Thatcher.

== Scenario ==
The sequence starts with Glinda encouraging the fearful Munchkins to "Come Out, Come Out, Wherever You Are" and meet Dorothy, who "fell from a star" named Kansas, so that "a miracle occurred". Dorothy begins singing, modestly explaining through descriptive phrasing that “It Really Was No Miracle”; it was the wind that brought the apparent miracle. The Munchkins soon join in and sing joyfully, perhaps not really understanding how she got there, but happy at the result. Like several of the songs on the film's soundtrack, this one makes extensive use of rhyming wordplay, containing as many Hays Office-approved words rhyming with "witch" as the composers could think of: "itch", "which", "sitch"-uation, "rich", etc.

After a short interval in which two Munchkins present a bouquet to Dorothy, Glinda tells the Munchkins to "let the joyous news be spread" that "the wicked old witch at last is dead!" The Munchkins then sing the march-style number "Ding-Dong! The Witch Is Dead". After its one verse, there is another interruption, as the city officials need to determine if the witch is "undeniably and reliably dead". The coroner (Meinhardt Raabe) avers that she is, and the mayor reiterates Glinda's advice to the Munchkins to spread the news. The Munchkins oblige, and sing "Ding-Dong! The Witch Is Dead" again. As the Munchkin soldiers march, looking vaguely like toys, some trumpeters issue a fanfare very similar to the fanfare at the beginning of the "March of the Toys" from Babes in Toyland. This has a notable though perhaps unintended subtlety. In 1903, the operetta had been written to compete with an early and successful Broadway rendition of The Wizard of Oz. In addition, in 1934, there had been a film version of Babes in Toyland, which was presumably still recent in the memories of the audience.

In the next interval, three Munchkin girls in ballet outfits and dancing en pointe sing "We Represent the Lullaby League", and welcome Dorothy to Munchkinland. Immediately after, three tough-looking Munchkin boys sing "We Represent the Lollipop Guild", actually the same tune as "Lullaby League", and they similarly welcome Dorothy to Munchkinland, the center Munchkin (Jerry Maren) giving her a large round all-day sucker. The boys fade back into the crowd as they all come forward and begin singing and dancing "We Welcome You to Munchkinland".

The Munchkins sing and dance merrily, with "Tra-la-la-la-la-la-las", until the Wicked Witch of the West (Margaret Hamilton), the other witch's sister, bursts onto the scene in fire and brimstone, putting a sudden stop to the Munchkins' revelry, as her own well-known, sinister-sounding instrumental theme plays on the track.

== Cutting room floor ==
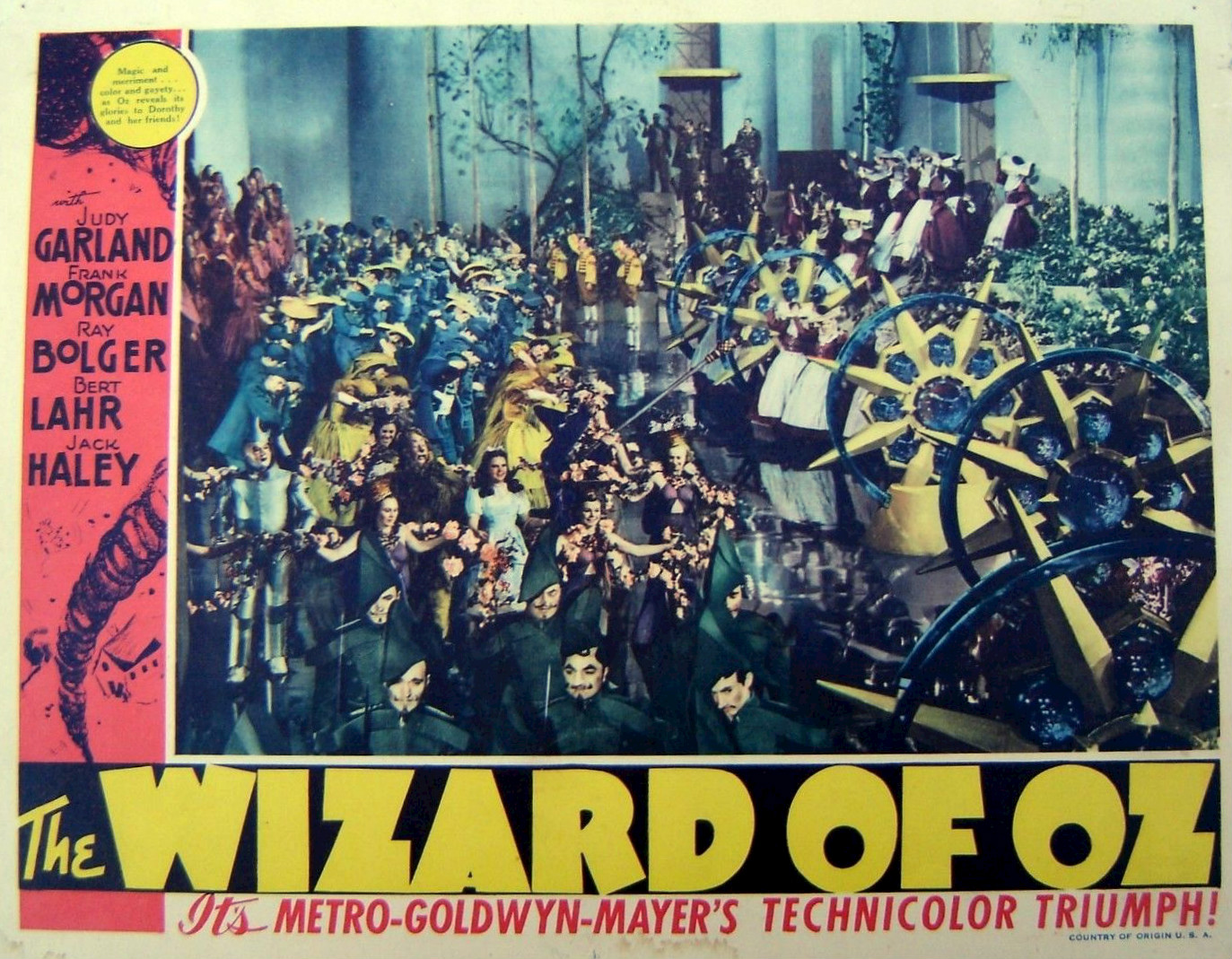
1939 lobby card depicting the cut reprise

There was to have been a reprise of the song, beginning "Hail Hail! The Witch is Dead", sung by the leader of the Winkies (the witch's guards) after the Wicked Witch of the West had been melted and the spell over them was broken, and the lead Winkie had given Dorothy the witch's broomstick. It was to be continued by the townspeople of the Emerald City, who would sing it in a medley along with a reprise of "The Merry Old Land of Oz".

This song and its scenes were cut from the film, which instead jumps directly from the witch's castle (minus the singing Winkie) to the Wizard's throne room. Parts of the song's recording survived and were included in the Deluxe CD soundtrack. The film footage of the celebration is lost, with the exception of a short clip that was actually in the film's original theatrical trailer, though it had been cut from the film.

It was re-staged in the 1995 television stage production The Wizard of Oz in Concert: Dreams Come True, and also in the 2011 Andrew Lloyd Webber musical.

== Voices ==
Nearly all of the Munchkin voices were dubbed in by uncredited voice actors, who sang in their normal voices at a specific tempo, and the recordings were electronically pitched up to create the Munchkin "voices" that the audience hears during playback. The Deluxe CD includes the actual voices of the three "Lollipop Guild" on-screen performers for contrast. According to the CD liner notes, the uncredited voice actors for certain segments were:

- "The Lullaby League": Lorraine Bridges, Betty Rome and Carol Tevis.
- "The Lollipop Guild": Billy Bletcher, Pinto Colvig, and Harry Stanton.
- "Hail Hail the Witch Is Dead": Ken Darby (the arranger)

Bletcher and Colvig had previously performed voice work notably in Three Little Pigs, and would go on to do a significant amount of voice work for the Warner and Disney cartoon studios. Bletcher himself was a short man, at 5 feet 2 inches, though notably taller than the Munchkins he voiced.

== Cover versions ==
- Glenn Miller and his Orchestra recorded it in 1939, featuring vocals by Marion Hutton
- Ella Fitzgerald recorded it for her 1961 album Ella Fitzgerald Sings the Harold Arlen Songbook, but it was not included until the 1984 reissue.
- Composer Harold Arlen recorded the song for his 1966 Columbia Records album Harold Sings Arlen (With Friend) as a duet with Barbra Streisand, who would later include their recording on her 2002 Duets album.
- Sammy Davis Jr. sang it live with Buddy Rich on The Sounds of '66
- In 1967, The Fifth Estate charted their biggest hit with a cover of the song featuring the bourrée from Michael Praetorius's Terpsichore suite in the instrumental break and coda. This version, which reached #11 on the Billboard Hot 100 chart. This recording has been the highest American charting recording of any Harold Arlen or Wizard of Oz song by any artist since the modern chart era began in 1940.
- Bing Crosby (on his 1968 album Thoroughly Modern Bing)
- Klaus Nomi performed a cover which was released as a single in 1982.
- Rosemary Clooney - for her 1983 album Rosemary Clooney Sings the Music of Harold Arlen

== In popular culture ==
- In The Goon Show, it was often used as the closing theme tune, and was played live onstage by the Wally Stott Orchestra.
- The 1991 film The Naked Gun 2½: The Smell of Fear contains a scene parodying Casablanca where Jane Spencer (Priscilla Presley) asks piano player Sam (James Gilstrap) "Sam, would you play our song, just one more time?". He promptly begins a rendition of "Ding-Dong! The Witch Is Dead."
- In The Simpsons 1993 episode "Selma's Choice", while the family is driving to a funeral, Homer Simpson and Bart Simpson sing "Ding-Dong! The Witch is Dead."
- The British band Hefner end their song "The Day That Thatcher Dies" with children singing "Ding Dong, The Witch Is Dead" in reference to former British prime minister, Margaret Thatcher.
- The song is briefly parodied in the Lizzie McGuire episode "The Rise and Fall of Kate" by Miranda Sanchez and Gordo, as a method of celebrating fellow student Kate Sanders' fall from power.
- In the season 3 premiere of the Fox TV series Glee, cast members Lea Michele and Chris Colfer sing a duet version.
- In Brooklyn Nine-Nine, the season 7 episode, titled "Ding Dong", depicts Captain Raymond Holt celebrating the death of his rival Commissioner Madeleine Wuntch by chanting "Ding Dong, the Wuntch is Dead!"

=== Death of Margaret Thatcher ===
Following the death of former British Prime Minister Margaret Thatcher in 2013, a social media campaign to encourage sales of the song so it would chart in the UK singles chart emerged among anti-Conservative activists. The campaigns Facebook page had already been set up in 2007. The song reached #2 on the chart behind Duke Dumont and A*M*E's "Need U (100%)", and peaked atop the Scottish Singles Chart.

Ruth Duccini and Jerry Maren, who portrayed Munchkins in the 1939 film, criticized the campaign, with Maren calling the efforts "shocking" and Duccini stating, "Nobody deserves to be treated in such a way. When we were filming the movie no one intended it to be used in this way. I am ashamed, I really am". Due to the implication of its context as a celebration of Thatcher's death, BBC Radio 1 did not broadcast the song in its entirety during its countdown programme The Official Chart, instead playing a Newsbeat report about the campaign. The campaign was countered by one involving "I'm in Love with Margaret Thatcher" (led by the lead singer of its performers, Notsensibles), which charted at number 35 alongside "Ding-Dong! The Witch Is Dead".

"Ding-Dong! The Witch Is Dead" also held the record for the Top 10 hit with the shortest ever runtime at 51 seconds, eclipsing two anti-Boris Johnson songs from the Christmas charts of 2020 and 2021, each available to download with playing times of 56 seconds. The shortest playing Top 40 hit was "The Ladies' Bras", a single by Jonny Trunk and Wisbey from 2007, which is 36 seconds long. In 2025, both records were broken by the 34-second long "Steve's Lava Chicken", a song by Jack Black from the A Minecraft Movie soundtrack which reached number 9.

==== Chart performance ====
Chart (2013)	Peak position
Scottish Singles Sales (Official Charts)	1
UK Singles (Official Charts)	2
UK Indie (Official Charts)	2
Ireland (IRMA)	30

== See also ==
- "Liar Liar GE2017", a 2017 anti-austerity protest song that was not given airplay
- Musical selections in The Wizard of Oz
