= If I Only Had a Brain =

1939 song

"If I Only Had a Brain" (also "If I Only Had a Heart" and "If I Only Had the Nerve") is a song by Harold Arlen (music) and Yip Harburg (lyrics). It was sung in the 1939 film The Wizard of Oz by the character Scarecrow, played by Ray Bolger, and later by the Tin Man and Cowardly Lion, played respectively by Jack Haley and Bert Lahr, when they meet Dorothy, played by Judy Garland. The characters pine about what each wants from the Wizard. It was also sung in Jeremy Sams and Andrew Lloyd Webber's 2011 musical adaptation with an additional reprise called "If We Only Had a Plan" when the characters discuss how to rescue Dorothy in Act II.

Originally written by Arlen and Harburg as "I'm Hanging On To You" for the 1937 Broadway musical Hooray for What!, the song was ultimately dropped from that show, and when the pair was later hired to do the songs for Oz, Harburg simply wrote new lyrics to his catchy melody, a syncopated schottische in the style of tunes used for vaudeville soft shoe and sand dancing.

== "If I Only Had a Brain" ==
The Scarecrow's version of the song is sung about getting a brain. The original recording included an extravagant Busby Berkeley-choreographed dance routine, but this was eventually cut for length reasons. A closing vocal stanza was likewise cut. Both pieces still exist and are available for viewing.

In the film as officially released, he sings three verses of this song (with Dorothy singing part of the second verse), then falls over comically. In the original cut, though, he sings the first three verses, begins to dance, and eventually a crow takes a large portion of his straw. The scarecrow then flies in the air to get it back, which he does. Then, he does some splits (forward and backward), and then a pumpkin rolls down the road. When it goes through the scarecrow's legs, he is thrown high into the air. Now, he comes down, bounces against the fences, sings a fourth verse of this song, then falls down.

That sequence was eventually used as a segment in the 1985 film That's Dancing! and excerpts from that sequence were featured in The Wonderful Wizard of Oz: The Making of a Movie Classic, and Warner Bros. considered restoring it for Oz's 1998 theatrical re-release, but decided against it. The sequence is included as a DVD extra on the 1999, 2005, and 2009 releases.

Ray Bolger's original recording of the song was far more sedate compared to the version heard in the film; it was decided by the producers that a more energetic rendition would better suit Dorothy's initial meeting with the Scarecrow, and was re-recorded as such. Thought to be lost for over seven decades, a recording of this original version was discovered in 2009.

== "If I Only Had a Heart" ==
The Tin Man's version of the song, about getting a heart, is sung after he says "No heart. All hollow." In the song, a girl's voice (that of Adriana Caselotti, best known for playing the title role in Disney's Snow White and the Seven Dwarfs) comes in singing, "Wherefore art thou Romeo?"

The song was first recorded by Buddy Ebsen, originally cast as the Tin Man until a makeup-induced illness forced him to withdraw. Although it was re-recorded by his replacement, Jack Haley, Ebsen's original recording survived and can be heard as one of many bonus tracks on the 1995 deluxe soundtrack release, as well as various home video/DVD releases from 1989-onward. Ebsen's version also contains the separately recorded single line recited by Adriana Caselotti.

Ebsen performed his vocals in his natural voice. In his Tin Man portion of the film, Haley eschewed his own natural, somewhat deeper and stronger voice, and both spoke and sang in a softened tone that he said was the tone he typically used when reading stories to his children.

Roger Daltrey sang a rock and roll tempo in the 1995 television special when he performed as the Tin Man while Jewel who performed as Dorothy sang the verse "Wherefore art thou Romeo?" in order for it to have a girl's voice in the background.

== "If I Only Had the Nerve" ==
The Cowardly Lion's version, about courage, is the shortest of the three, and is connected to "We're Off to See the Wizard" by a bridge saying "Then I'm sure to get a brain; a heart; a home; the nerve" (a longer version was written, but it was shortened in the interest of balance, since Bert Lahr was given a second musical number, "If I Were King of the Forest," later in the film).

Lahr's characteristic regional accent was exploited and emphasized for comic effect in this song, with several words pronounced in a stereotypically "Brooklynese" way: "voive" for "verve", "desoive" for "deserve", and "noive" for "nerve".

The first line was initially recorded as "Yeah, it's sad to be admittin'/When you're vicious as a kitten," but it was eventually changed to "Yeah, it's sad, believe it, missy/When you're born to be a sissy."

The longer version of this song was used in the 1995 television stage performance. It was sung by Nathan Lane in a Broadway tempo. This version includes the bridge verses sung by The Scarecrow (Jackson Browne), Tin Man (Roger Daltrey) and Dorothy (Jewel).

== See also ==
- Musical selections in The Wizard of Oz
