= We're Off to See the Wizard =

1939 song

"We're Off to See the Wizard" is one of the classic songs from the Academy Award-winning 1939 film The Wizard of Oz. Composer Harold Arlen described it, along with "The Merry Old Land of Oz" and "Ding-Dong! The Witch Is Dead", as one of the "lemon drop" songs of the film. The lyrics are by E.Y. "Yip" Harburg.

The melody's first appearance begins with the Munchkins reciting and Judy Garland echoing "Follow the Yellow Brick Road!", which turns into a group vocal by the Munchkins (while Garland skips and dances along the road) and then segues into "You're Off to See the Wizard".

The song occurs as a vocal three more times in the film soundtrack, along with several short instrumental references in the underscore:

1. As a duet, sung by Judy Garland and Ray Bolger
2. As a trio, sung by Judy Garland, Ray Bolger, and Jack Haley onscreen, but Buddy Ebsen's voice heard instead of Haley's
3. As a quartet, sung by Judy Garland, Ray Bolger, again Buddy Ebsen's voice, and Bert Lahr

Although Jack Haley replaced Ebsen on-screen and in the Tin Man's solo recording of "If I Only Had a Heart", it was deemed unnecessary for the group vocal to be re-recorded, so the voice in the film as released remains Ebsen's. His voice can be detected by listening for the male voice enunciating the "R" in words like "Wizard", as Ebsen's regional accent emphasized the "R" much more strongly than Haley's did.

In The Wizard of Oz and Other Harold Arlen Songs, Shorty Rogers re-worked the song as (in the words of Talkin' Broadway) "a high-energy, wild Latin dance extravaganza".

The song was later heard in a few MGM animated cartoons, notably the Tom and Jerry shorts Professor Tom and The Truce Hurts. The 2011 animated adaption, Tom and Jerry and the Wizard of Oz, also features the song, where it is sung by Tuffy as a Munchkin Mouse.

Alvin and the Chipmunks covered this song for their 1969 album The Chipmunks Go to the Movies.

In December 1972, Eugene Cernan sang the song on the surface of the Moon while hopping in lunar gravity.

Mitch Miller and his male chorus later recorded a single of the song for the children's label Golden Records. Singer Anne Lloyd was featured as Dorothy on the song.

== See also ==
- Musical selections in The Wizard of Oz
