= If I Were King of the Forest =

Song from The Wizard of Oz

"If I Were King of the Forest" is a song from the 1939 film The Wizard of Oz, with music by Harold Arlen and lyrics by E.Y. Harburg.

The comic number is sung by the Cowardly Lion, played by Bert Lahr, during the scene at the Emerald City, when the Lion, Dorothy (with Toto), the Tin Woodman and the Scarecrow are waiting to learn whether the Wizard will grant them an audience. Lahr employs a spoken interlude near the end of the number, in which the rest of the group ask him how he would deal with other powerful animals if he were king, for example:

Supposin' you met an elephant?
I'd wrap him up in cellophant!
What if it were a brontosaurus?
I'd show him who was King of the Forest!

The song contains the line "What makes the Hottentot so hot?", a phrase that refers to the Khoikhoi tribe of Africa.

Two portions of the song were cut for reasons of time: a brief middle stanza in which the other characters echo the verse that preceded it and Lahr first proclaims himself "Monarch of all I survey" (a line repeated later in the song), and the final stanza which ended with the Lion proclaiming "If I...were...king!" (two versions were recorded: one where Lahr himself unsuccessfully tries to hit the high note on the final word, and instead does so in his character's trademark low register; the other has the final high note powerfully delivered by operatic soprano Georgia Stark, who was paid $25 for her involvement).

The complete version of the song can be heard on the deluxe 1995 soundtrack release from Rhino Records, along with the less extensive single-disc release. Additionally, the complete version was used for the 1996 soundtrack recording of The Wizard of Oz in Concert: Dreams Come True, also from Rhino. In this version, Nathan Lane (who performs as the Lion) has an addition to the lyrics which is "Not queen, not duke, not prince...or the Artist Formerly known as Prince".

The song has been used in several of the stage versions of The Wizard of Oz. In addition, Tom Hardy sings it while playing the title role of Al Capone in the 2020 biopic film Capone.

The song does not appear in the 4D version of the film created in 2025 to screen at Sphere in the Las Vegas Valley due to the film's runtime being shortened to 75 minutes from the original 101 minutes.

== See also ==
- Musical selections in The Wizard of Oz
- The Merry Old Land of Oz
- The Jitterbug (deleted song)
