= The Muny =

Amphitheater in St. Louis, Missouri

St. Louis Municipal Opera Theatre
- The Muny
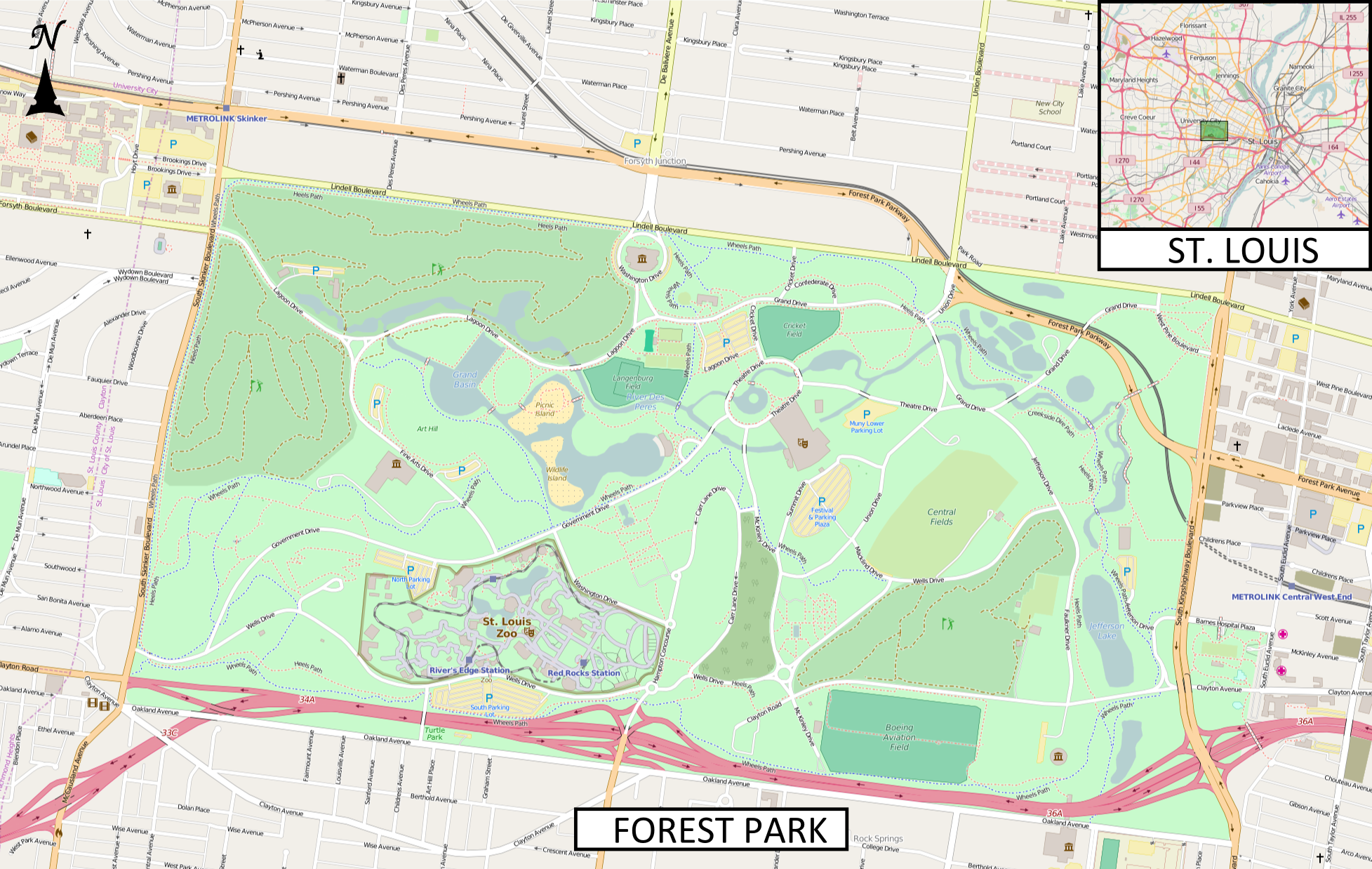
- Location within Forest Park
- Former names: Municipal Theater of St. Louis (1917–19)
- Address: 1 Theatre Dr; St. Louis, MO 63112-1019
- Location: Forest Park
- Coordinates: 38.640560°N 90.280484°W
- Owner: Municipal Theatre Association of St. Louis
- Capacity: 11,000
- Public transit: MetroBus

Construction
- Opened: June 5, 1917
- Renovated: 1923, 1930, 1935, 1997, 2004, 2014–15, 2018–19
- Cost: $10,000 ($295,872 in 2025 dollars)

Website
- muny.org

The St. Louis Municipal Opera Theatre (commonly known as The Muny) is an amphitheater located in St. Louis, Missouri. The theatre seats 11,000 people with about 1,500 free seats in the last nine rows that are available on a first-come, first-served basis.

The Muny season runs every year from mid-June to mid-August. It is run by a nonprofit organization. The current president and chief executive is Kwofe Coleman. The current artistic director and executive producer is Mike Isaacson.

== History ==
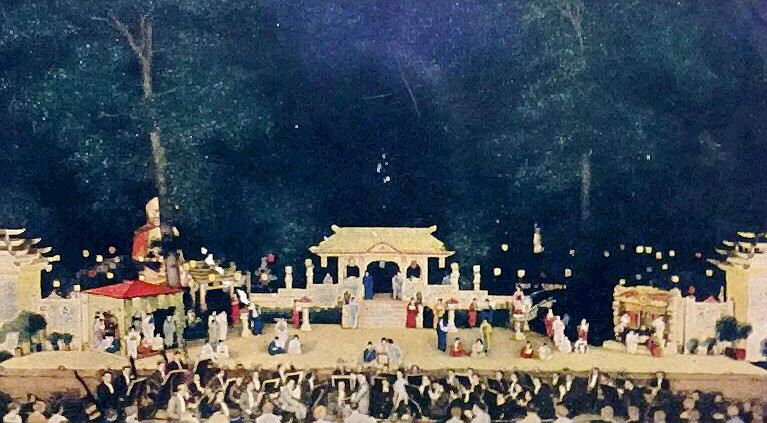
The Muny in 1923

In 1914, Luther Ely Smith began staging pageant-masques on Art Hill in Forest Park. In 1916, a grassy area between two oak trees on the present site of The Muny was chosen for a production of As You Like It produced by Margaret Anglin and starring Sydney Greenstreet with a local cast of "1,000 St. Louis folk dancers and folk singers" in connection with the tercentenary of Shakespeare's death. The audience sat in portable chairs on a gravel floor.

Soon after, the Convention Board of the St. Louis Advertising Club was looking for an entertainment feature for its 13th annual convention, which was to take place June 3, 1917. Mayor Henry Kiel, attorney Guy Golterman, and Parks Commissioner Nelson Cunliff stepped in and, in 49 days (not counting seven lost to rain), created the first municipally owned outdoor theatre in the United States. On June 5, 1917, the opera Aida was presented on what would become the Muny stage.

In 1919, the new theatre received a name: St. Louis Municipal Opera Theatre, or "The Muny" for short. The first show under the Muny banner was Robin Hood, which opened on June 16, 1919, and featured Mayor Kiel as King Richard. Concerts were performed here prior to the opening of Riverport Amphitheatre in 1991.

By the beginning of the 1921 season, the facility had a new permanent stage. Its base was concrete to prevent damage from floods, such as one that damaged the theater's equipment on opening night in 1919. Improvements for 1922 included a new pergola, 750 permanent opera chairs, 500 parking spaces for automobiles, and the addition of "comfort stations". Additions for 1923 included 1,800 permanent seats, an extra stage for rehearsals, and a sound amplifier to enable people in the back of the audience to hear as well as those in the front.

On January 4, 1923, the Municipal Theater Association opened a free school for people who aspired to sing in the chorus for that summer's productions. Of 420 applicants, 239 had been accepted as of the class's beginning, with 45 remaining to be examined. Classes met two nights a week until May 1, when rehearsals began.

Keil stepped down from being president of the Municipal Theater Association in 1924, saying that the enterprise should be headed by businessmen, and Cunliff simultaneously left his position as chairman of the group's Executive Productions Committee. H. J. Pettengill, chairman of Southwest Bell Telephone Company's board of directors, was elected the new president.

Reserved seats for all paid admissions were instituted in 1925, after 2,400 numbered chairs were installed in the previously unreserved 25-cent section.

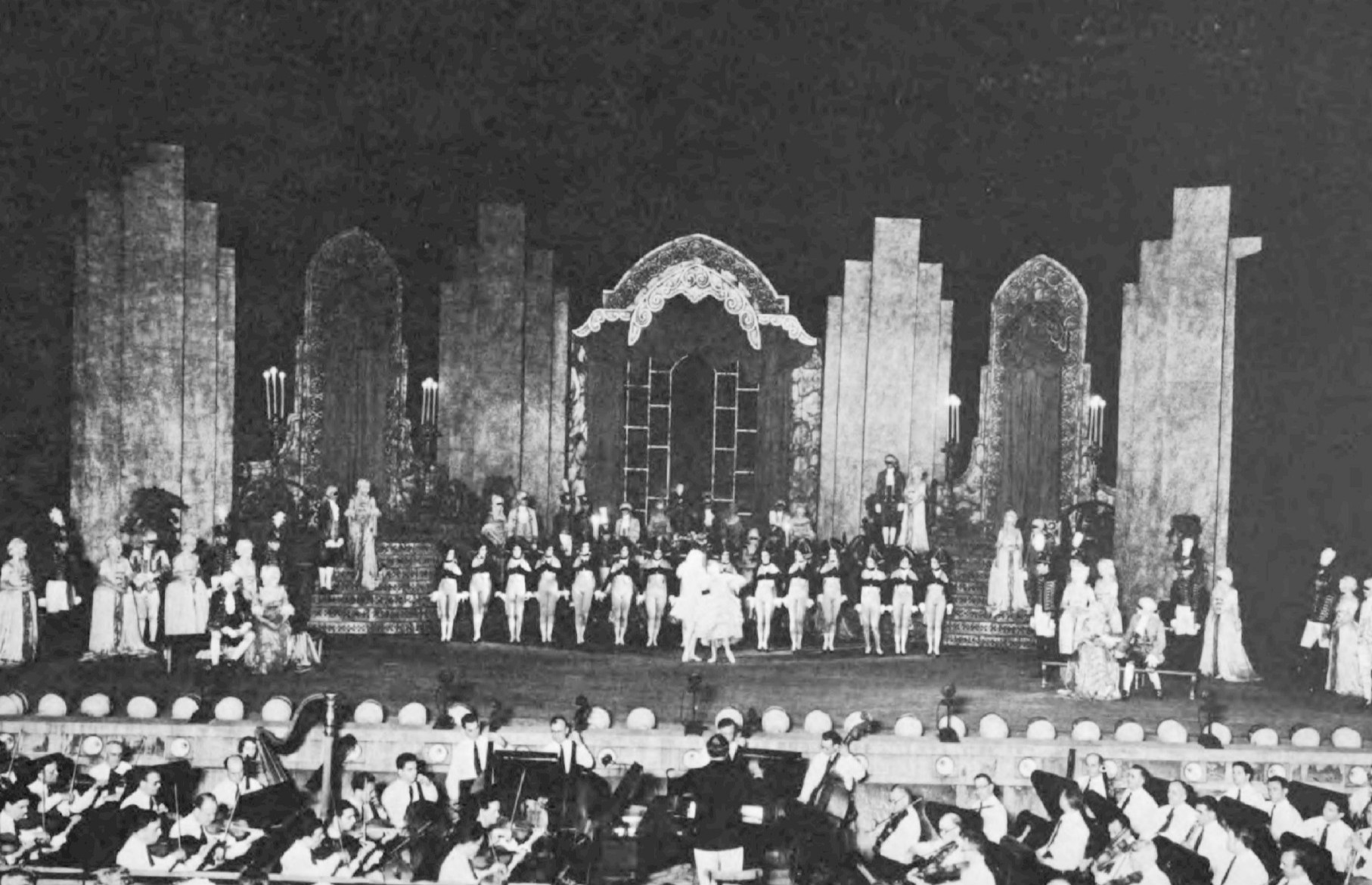
Stage in 1932

In 1930, the stage was equipped with a turntable for performance purposes. It was reconstructed in 1997 due to dilapidation. As part of the Second Century Capital Campaign/2018-19 renovations, the turntable was replaced. In 1994, The Muny's board of directors founded the Muny Kids, a select group of performers between the ages of 7 and 13 who traveled around St. Louis performing, and in the summer gave preview shows prior to the production. In 1998, the Muny Teens group was formed for the same purpose, featuring teen performers between the ages of 14 and 18.

The chairman of the board of the Muny in 2005–2006 was William H. T. Bush (younger brother of former president George H. W. Bush). The current Chairman of the Board is John W. Lemkemeier.

== Production ==
The Muny produces all of its musicals (typically seven) in the season, which operates only in the summer. During the winter, a full-time staff of 35 people prepare for the next summer season. During the season itself, the summer staff expands to include more than 500 people in various positions. All shows are rehearsed within the course of 11 days, with two technical rehearsals (one costumed, one not) being held in the two to three days before each show's opening. Shows run 7 days, although exceptions to this have occurred, particularly in recent years, when each season has had at least one production with an extended run. There is a two to three day break between shows to allow for tech, set, boom, and floor change.

In 2015, The Muny began producing Muny Magic at The Sheldon, bi-annual concerts at the Sheldon Concert Hall. They are cabaret-style concerts featuring artists who have appeared on the Muny stage. In recent years, Muny Artistic Director and Executive Producer Mike Isaacson has announced the lineup for the upcoming summer season at the spring installments of Muny Magic at the Sheldon.

== Concerts at the Muny ==
For many years, live concerts in the offseason were common at The Muny. The last one was by the Moody Blues and Kansas on August 29, 1991. Other notable artists who have performed on the Muny stage include Whitney Houston, Patti LaBelle, Sting, Barry Manilow, Bob Dylan, Allman Brothers, Hank Williams Jr., The Beach Boys, and James Taylor. In 2024, The Muny revived the tradition and presented its first live concert in more than 30 years—a one-night-only show starring Emmy, Grammy, Oscar and Tony winner John Legend accompanied by the St. Louis Symphony Orchestra. "We have been eager but deliberate in recent years about finding the right opportunity to bring live concerts back to The Muny, and the alignment of John Legend with one of the best orchestras in the world, the St. Louis Symphony Orchestra, feels like the perfect opening for this next chapter," said Muny President & CEO Kwofe Coleman. "Generations of St. Louisans have memories of seeing legendary music acts on our magnificent stage, and I am excited to deliver this bit of nostalgia to our community at the end of our 2024 summer season."

== See also ==
- List of The Muny repertory
- List of contemporary amphitheatres
