= The Merry Old Land of Oz =

1939 song

"The Merry Old Land of Oz" is a song from the 1939 film The Wizard of Oz and the musical. The song is sung by the townspeople of the Emerald City, who are joined at appropriate times by the group of four travelers: Dorothy (with Toto), Scarecrow, Tin Man and Cowardly Lion. It was written by lyricist E.Y. Harburg and composer Harold Arlen. The verse of the song suggests that the people of the city do no actual work, since they "get up at twelve, and start to work at one, take an hour for lunch, and then at two [they]'re done". Their actions contradict that funny sentiment, however, as they are clearly doing plenty of work to "freshen up" the group of four to go see the Wizard. The revelers' laughter is interrupted by the Wicked Witch of the West, who is circling over the city, skywriting with her broom, ordering the citizens to "SURRENDER DOROTHY OR DIE". In the final cut of the film, the words "OR DIE" were dropped from the film as being too strong for the presumably young audience of the time.

== Covers and parodies ==
- This musical number was spoofed in the VeggieTales episode The Wonderful Wizard of Ha's.
- On the children's show Sesame Street episode 3695, Oscar the Grouch's girlfriend, Grundgetta has just opened her own Grouch beauty salon, and she asks Gina to be a test subject to attract Grouch customers. During the makeover procedure, Grundgetta and some back-up singing Grouches sing "At Grundgetta's Grouch Beauty Salon", a parody of "The Merry Old Land of Oz".
- In the season 11 Family Guy episode "Bigfat", Quagmire tries to convince Peter and Joe to join him on a trip to Canada by singing about the country's adult offerings via a parody of "The Merry Old Land of Oz", entitled "Canadian Nudie Bars". The song is also spoofed in "Fast Times at Buddy Cianci Jr. High" in a mashup with the prison drama series Oz.

== See also ==
- If I Were King of the Forest
- Musical selections in The Wizard of Oz
