= Surrender Dorothy =

Film special effect

The "Surrender Dorothy" scene from The Wizard of Oz, with the Wicked Witch of the West completing the "Y" of "Dorothy"

"Surrender Dorothy" is a famous special effect used in the 1939 film The Wizard of Oz, where the Wicked Witch of the West flies on her broomstick to write the two-word phrase across the sky. The phrase later attained local fame as graffiti in the Washington, D.C., metropolitan area.

== Appearance in the movie ==
The phrase first appears in the 1939 version of The Wizard of Oz, not in the novel or any previous adaptation. In the scene, Dorothy Gale has reached the Emerald City with her companions The Scarecrow, Tin Woodman, and Cowardly Lion, where they are treated to the hospitality and technological comforts of the fantastic city. As they leave the "Wash & Brush Up Co.", the Wicked Witch of the West appears in the sky riding her broomstick, skywriting the words "SURRENDER DOROTHY". The frightened townspeople of the Emerald City and the four protagonists respond by rushing to the chamber where the Wizard of Oz himself resides.

The special effect was achieved by using a hypodermic needle, spreading black ink across the bottom of a glass tank filled with tinted water.

In the first 120-minute test screening of the film, the message was longer, reading "SURRENDER DOROTHY OR DIE — W W W," but this was cut by producer Mervyn LeRoy, concerned it was too scary for children. This longer version of the phrase was later restored in 2025 via CGI for The Wizard of Oz at Sphere, an immersive 4D version of the film screening at Sphere in the Las Vegas Valley.

== Washington area graffiti ==
In 1974, students of Connelly School of the Holy Child displayed the message on the illuminated bridge carrying Linden Lane over the outer loop of I-495 (the "Capital Beltway") near the Washington D.C. Temple of the Church of Jesus Christ of Latter-day Saints in Kensington, Maryland. The message was an advertisement for their school's production of The Wizard of Oz, and was made by pressing newsprint into the bridge's chain-link fence.

It is not clear when the message was first written in paint. In the 1980s, it was common to see it on the adjacent railroad bridge, which carries the CSX Transportation's Metropolitan Subdivision. It has been removed and re-painted many times since.

The railroad bridge is the second of three bridges over the Beltway near that point. Motorists approaching from the east see the temple first, then the Seminary Road bridge, then the temple and the location of the phrase on the railroad bridge. The Linden Lane bridge is the third bridge.

In summer 2007, a new piece of graffiti appeared on the rail bridge. The word "SURRENDER" was reduced in size to fit into a single section of the rail bridge, and the word "DOROTHY" was omitted from the graffiti. The previous message is no longer visible, but may still be detected at the top of the bridge, as the paint used to cover it does not exactly match the original paint on the bridge. The smaller "SURRENDER" graphic is located near the bottom of the bridge, over the far-left lane of traffic on the Outer Loop. On August 24, 2018, "SURRENDER DONALD" lettering (referring to US president Donald Trump) was spotted on the same bridge over the Washington Beltway. Evidently, the sign was made of easily removable letters that minimize property damage and was installed between 4 and 5 a.m. Reportedly, Claude Taylor and his MadDog PAC claimed responsibility. On November 5, during the 2020 United States presidential election, "SURRENDER DONALD" appeared again – this time in paint.

7 Locks Brewery in Rockville, Maryland initially named a beer Surrender Dorothy, with a version of the graffito/LDS church image on the label. Turner Entertainment, owner of The Wizard of Oz, opposed the use of the name and image by the brewery, which changed the beer name to "Surrender" and the can label to include "Dorothy" being painted over.

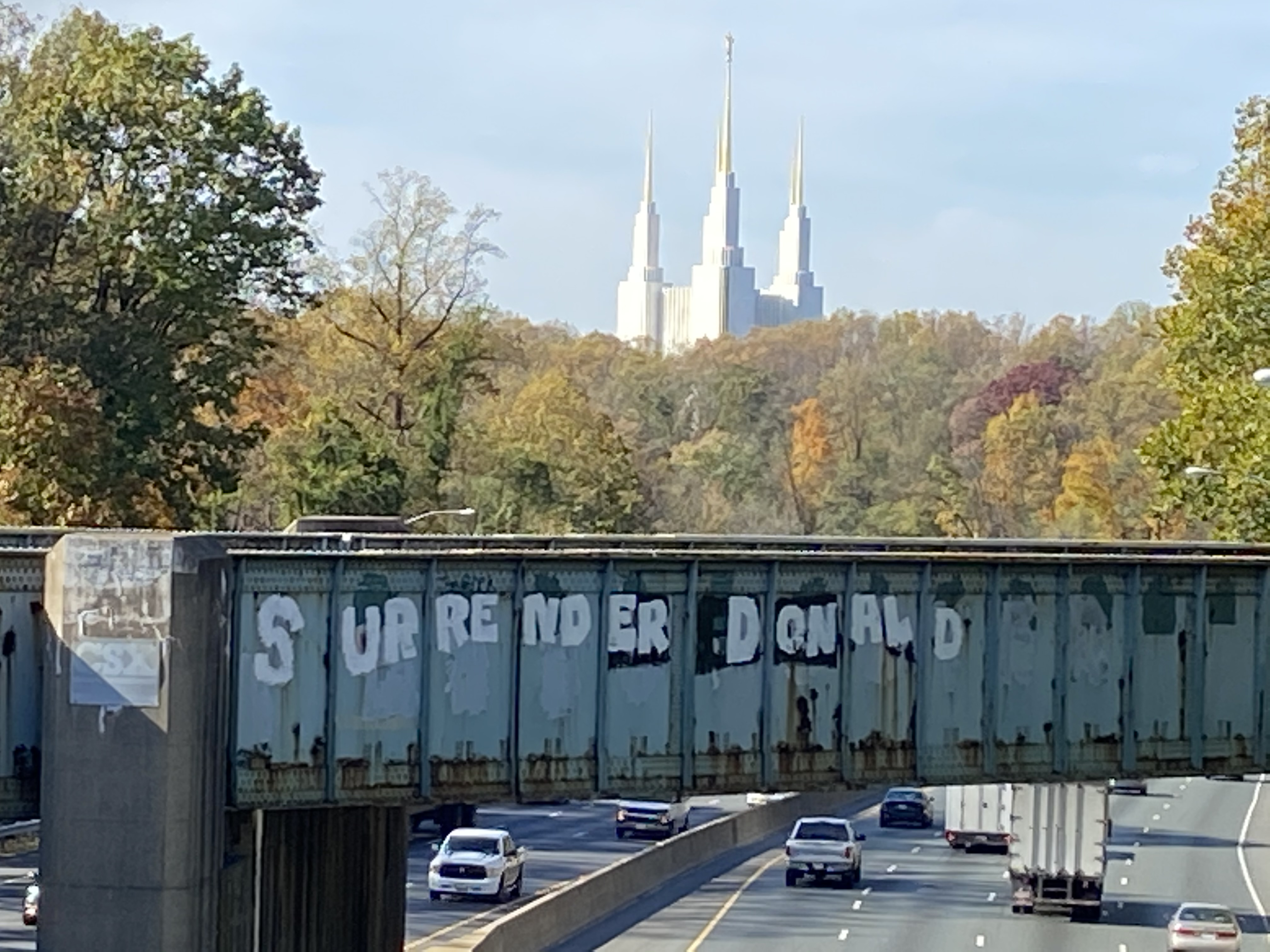
Washington LDS Temple as seen from Interstate 495. The graffiti was updated to say Surrender Donald

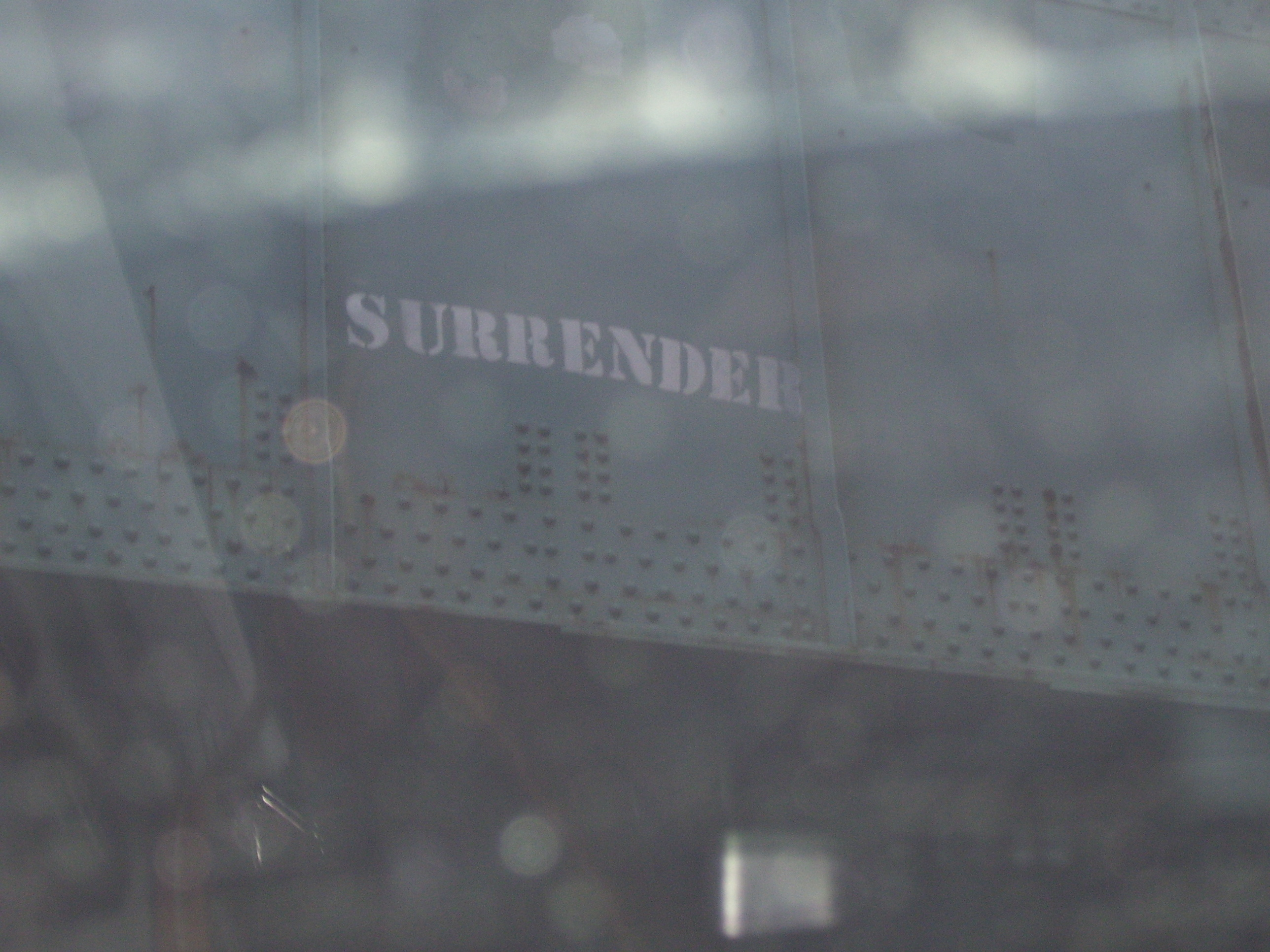
Miniature SURRENDER graffiti from 2007 stenciled on the green railroad bridge. Above the stencil are dark green squares where the previous graffiti has been painted over.

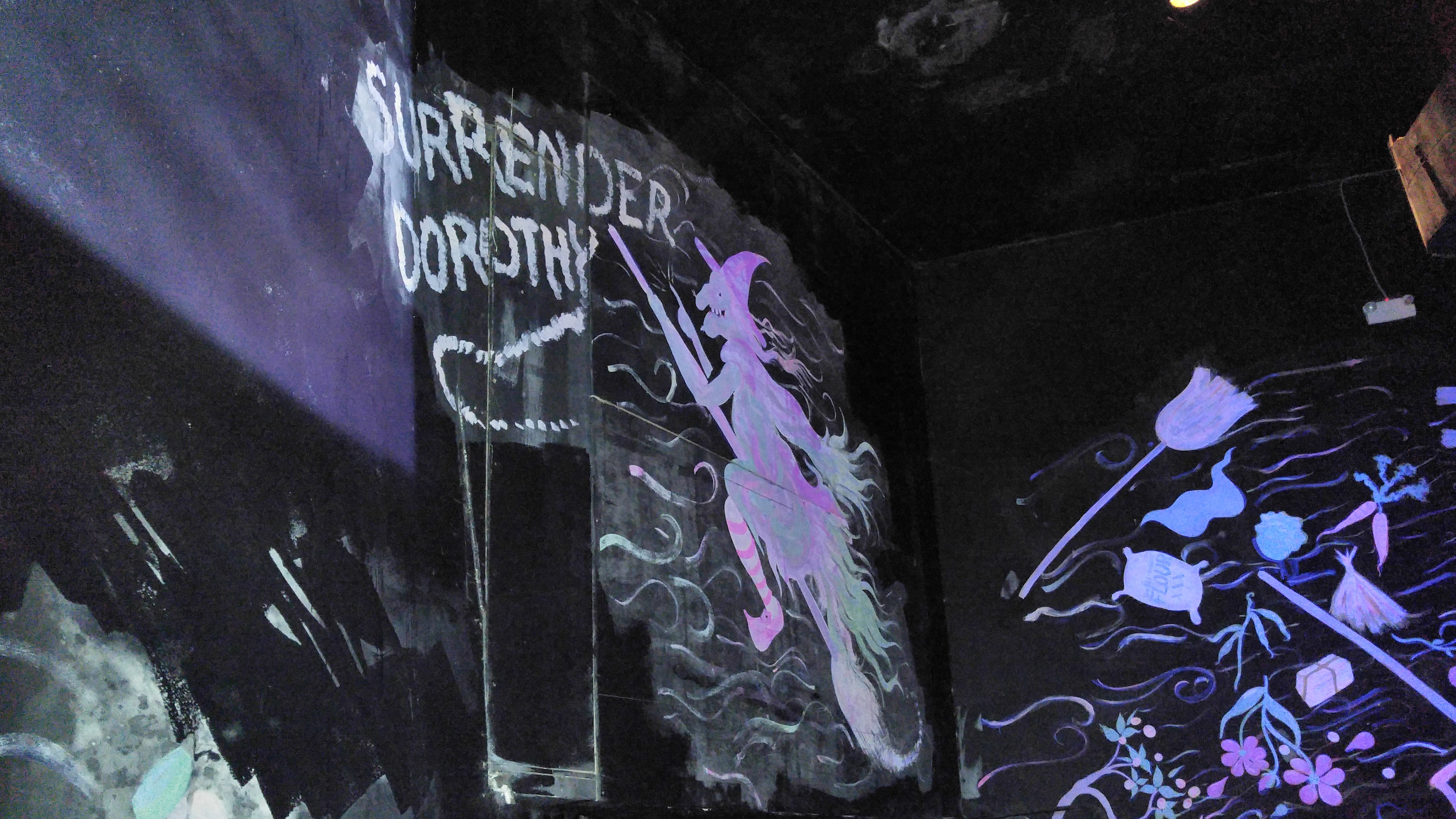
A "Surrender Dorothy" mural at a ski resort in North Carolina

== Other cultural references ==
In Martin Scorsese's 1985 film After Hours, Marcy (Rosanna Arquette) says her former husband would scream the phrase during his climax.

As part of the promotional campaign for The Wizard of Oz at Sphere, the phrase was skywritten above Long Beach, California, and Robert Moses State Park in Fire Island, New York, over the 2025 Fourth of July weekend, by the Farmingdale-based Skytypers Air Show Team.

The 2025 film Wicked: For Good, a re-imagining of The Wizard of Oz based on the second act of the stage show Wicked, features Elphaba (the Wicked Witch of the West) skywriting the message "Our Wizard Lies" above Munchkinland. In an inversion of the 1939 film, the message is written by clearing the clouds. Madame Morrible uses her weather magic to write "Oz dies".
