= The Wizard of Oz at Sphere =

2025 immersive version of The Wizard of Oz

- Promotional poster
- Directed by: Victor Fleming (original film)
- Written by: Noel Langley; Florence Ryerson; Edgar Allan Woolf; (orig. film)
- Based on: The Wonderful Wizard of Oz by L. Frank Baum
- Produced by: Mervyn LeRoy (orig. film); Jane Rosenthal (Sphere version); Ben Grossmann (Sphere version)
- Starring: Judy Garland; Frank Morgan; Ray Bolger; Bert Lahr; Jack Haley; Billie Burke; Margaret Hamilton; Charley Grapewin; The Munchkins; (original film)
- Cinematography: Harold Rosson (orig. film); Andrew Shulkind (Sphere version)
- Edited by: Blanche Sewell (orig. film); Jennifer Lame (Sphere version)
- Music by: Herbert Stothart (orig. film)
- Production companies: Sphere Studios; Warner Bros. Pictures
- Distributed by: Sphere Entertainment Co.
- Release date: August 28, 2025 (United States)
- Running time: 75 minutes
- Country: United States
- Language: English
- Budget: $100 million

The Wizard of Oz at Sphere is a 2025 American 4D film. It is an "immersive" version of Metro-Goldwyn-Mayer's 1939 musical fantasy film The Wizard of Oz, created specifically to be screened at Sphere in the Las Vegas Valley on the venue's 160,000-square-foot (15,000 m^{2}) video screen at 16K resolution. To fit the venue's format, the film's visuals were altered or replaced with artificial intelligence (AI) generated images, the musical score was re-recorded, preserving Herbert Stothart’s original 1939 compositions, and multi-sensory effects were added to immerse audiences. It is the third film to be screened at the venue under the "Sphere Experience" program, following Darren Aronofsky's 2023 documentary Postcard from Earth and the 2024 concert film V-U2 that depicts U2's residency at Sphere. The Wizard of Oz at Sphere began screening on August 28, 2025. Critics were polarized by the film, with many praising the immersive aspects but criticizing the quality of the AI-generated visuals.

== Plot ==
=== Atrium pre-show ===
As guests enter the Sphere's atrium, the room is lit and designed to resemble sepia-toned Kansas as depicted in the film's opening scenes. Replicas of Professor Marvel's cart and the Wizard's hot air balloon, as well as glass-case displays showcasing historical prints of L. Frank Baum's original Oz books and a pair of ruby slippers from the late Debbie Reynolds' personal collection are showcased. The audience is then led into the auditorium 45 minutes before showtime.

=== Sphere experience ===
As the audience is seated, the Sphere's screen displays a sepia-tinted image of a large modern-day auditorium resembling that of Radio City Music Hall in New York City. At showtime, the sound of an orchestra tuning up and a conductor's baton can be heard, signaling that the film is about to begin as the lights dim. The auditorium's curtains then rise up on cue with the film's opening theme to reveal the MGM "Leo the Lion" logo (with the Cowardly Lion taking Leo's place inside the filmstrip circle and roaring once), segueing right into the opening credits sequence whose cloud background fills the entire screen, followed by the film itself. Highlights of the film experience include wind, fog and leaves blowing around the auditorium during the tornado scene, which now places the audience inside its funnel, butterflies flying across the theatre during the first scenes in Oz, foam-made apples falling from the ceiling when Dorothy and Scarecrow deal with the angry Apple Tree, snow falling onto the audience when Glinda the Good Witch of the North lifts the spell on the poison poppies, pyrotechnics during the scenes in the Wizard's throne room, and life-size flying monkeys flying into the audience through the use of UAV technology. After Dorothy's final line ("Oh, Auntie Em. There's no place like home!") and the original film's "The End" card and cast list, an added closing credits for the Sphere version is spread across the screen.

=== Atrium post-show ===
At the conclusion of the film, the audience is led out of the auditorium and back into the atrium, now lit and designed to resemble the Emerald City in Technicolor. They are then directed by the Wizard's Guard towards a life-sized replica of the Wizard's throne room (complete with a projected motion-capture image of his ghostly green head) where guests interact with him.

== Development ==
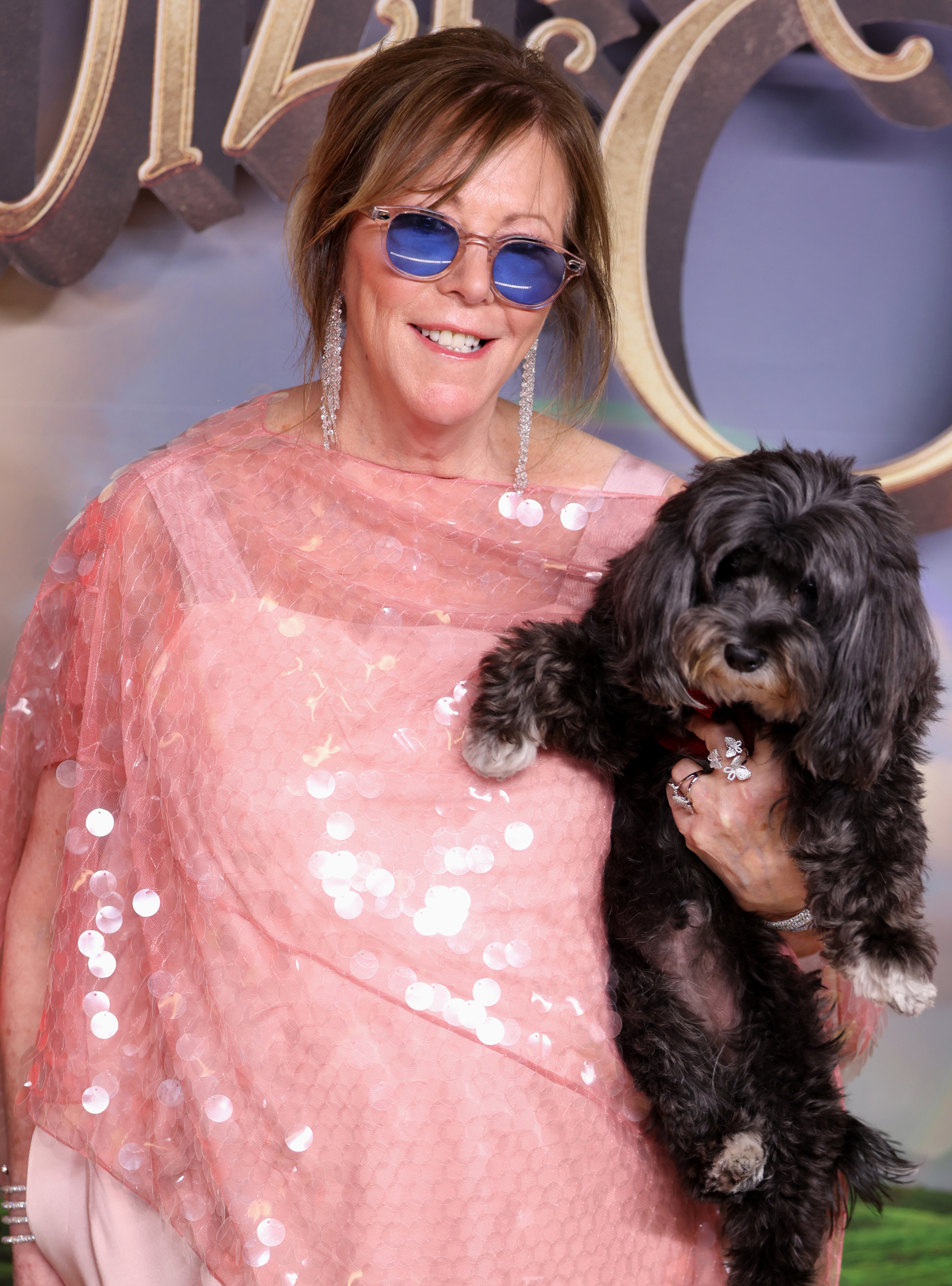
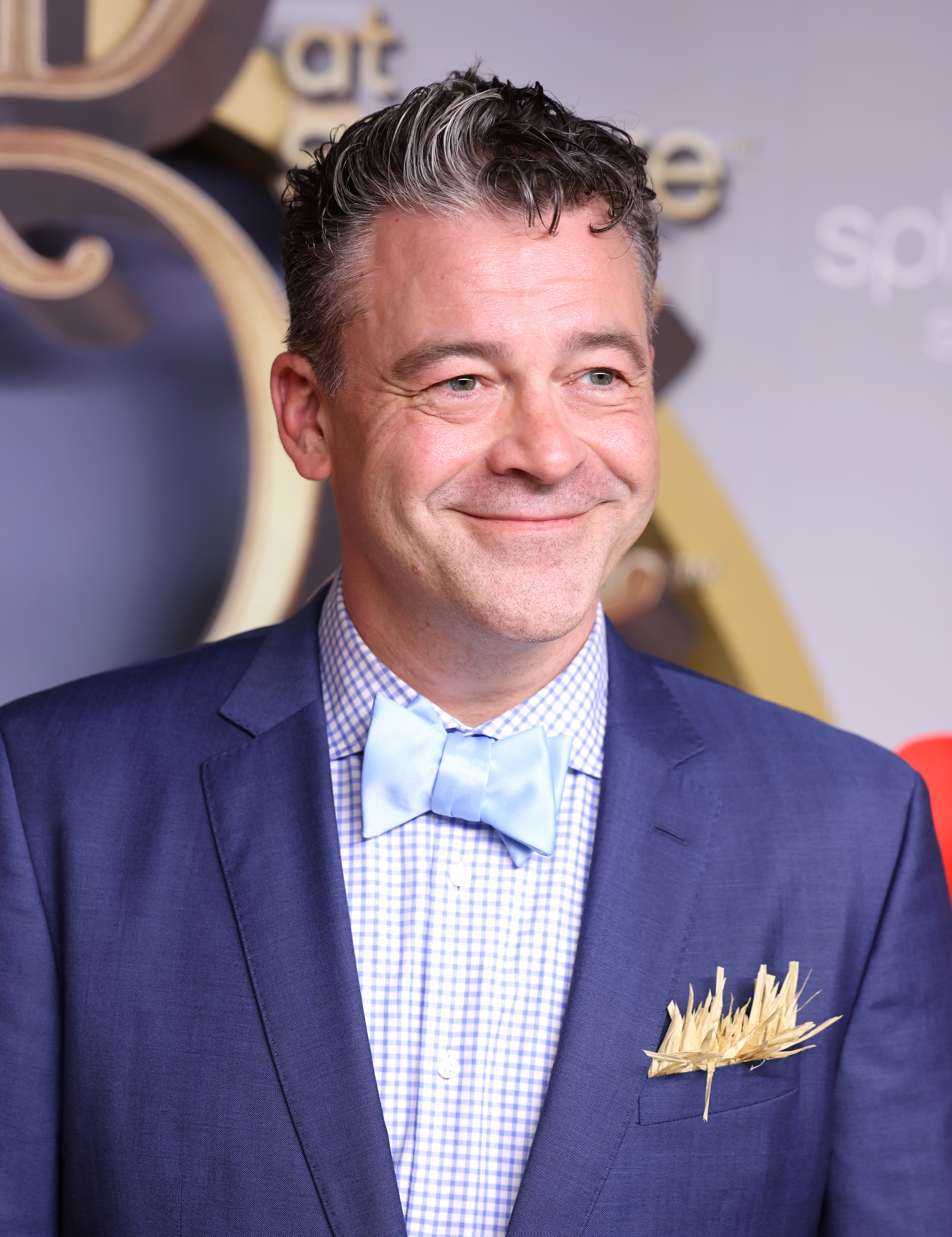
Jane Rosenthal (left) and Ben Grossmann (right), the producers of the Sphere version of the film

In 2024, an "immersive" version of the film was announced to be screening at Sphere in the Las Vegas Valley beginning on August 28, 2025. It is produced by Sphere Entertainment and Jane Rosenthal in collaboration with Google, Warner Bros., and VFX studio Magnopus. Artificial intelligence provided by Google AI was used to upscale the video resolution for the venue's 16K resolution screen and, using the Veo 2 and Imagen 3 Gemini models, generate additional imagery to expand shots beyond what was originally in frame. An estimated 1.2 petabytes of data were processed for the project. Traditional CG visual effects were also employed by Crafty Apes, Digital Domain, Gradient Effects, Haymaker VFX and Zoic Studios for the tornado scene and a recreation of the Wizard's ghostly green head during his throne room scenes. Live multi-sensory effects such as flashing lights, haptics, wind, fog and scents will be employed during screenings of the film. Jennifer Lame served as editor, along with Ben Grossmann as visual effects specialist, Paul Freeman as principal audio artist and Zack Winokur as creative director.

The film's soundtrack was also remastered to fit the Sphere's immersive sound system, in addition to having the entire score re-recorded with an 80-piece orchestra under the direction of David Newman, on the same scoring stage where it was originally recorded. The new recording preserves Herbert Stothart’s original 1939 Academy Award‑winning compositions. The changes made to select sequences resulted in the film's runtime also being shortened to 75 minutes from the original 101 minutes. Sphere Entertainment Executive Chairman and CEO James L. Dolan commented, "The original kind of dwelled on a few things that were somewhat superfluous." He added, "Everything you love about the movie, I guarantee, is in the movie." Among the cut material was the musical number "If I Were King of the Forest," sung by the Cowardly Lion as he, Scarecrow, Tin Man, Dorothy and Toto wait to see the Wizard outside his palace in the original film. Dolan and Warner Bros. Discovery's CEO David Zaslav make "two-second cameos" in the immersive film, their faces superimposed on two sailors in a rowboat during the tornado sequence.

== Release and marketing ==
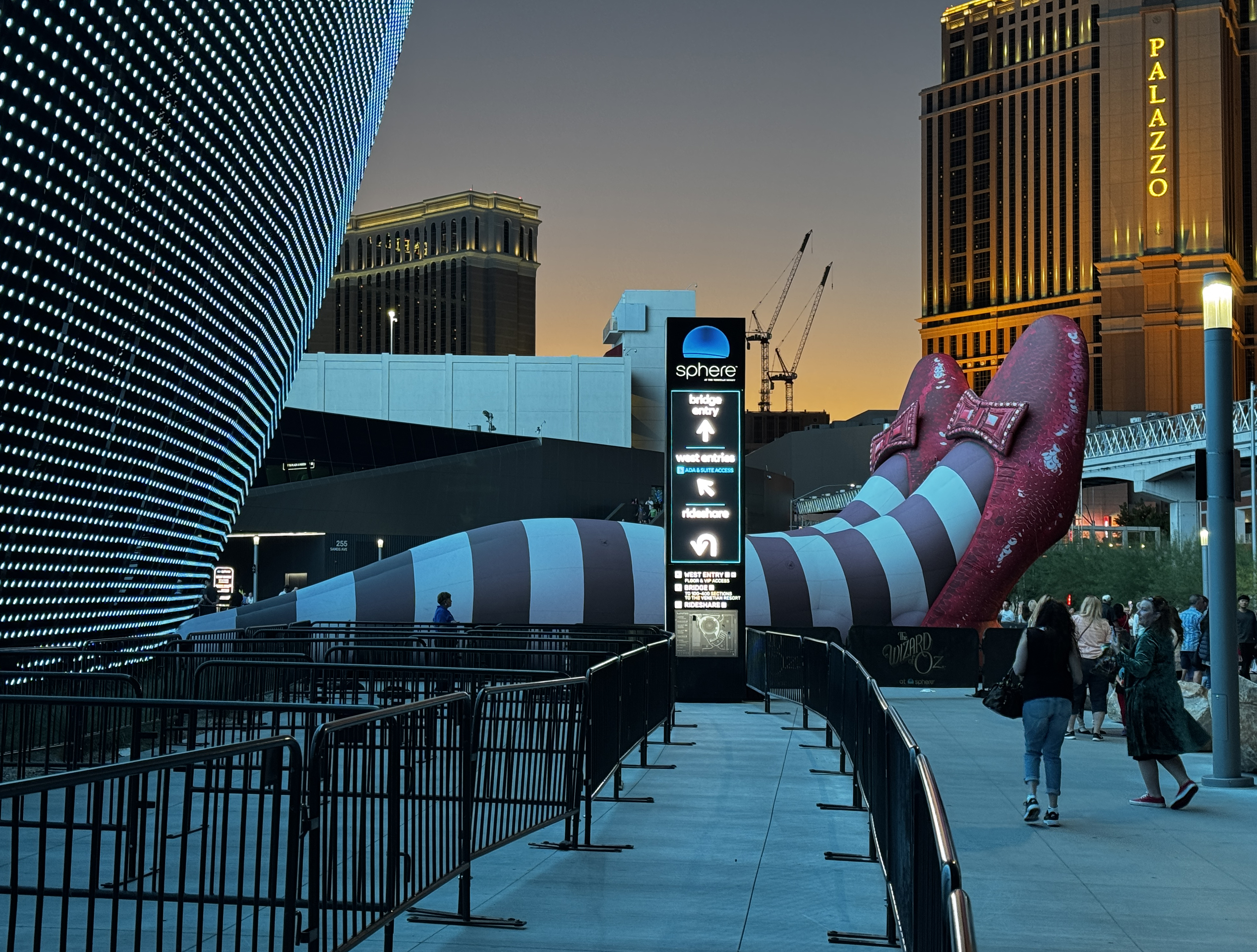
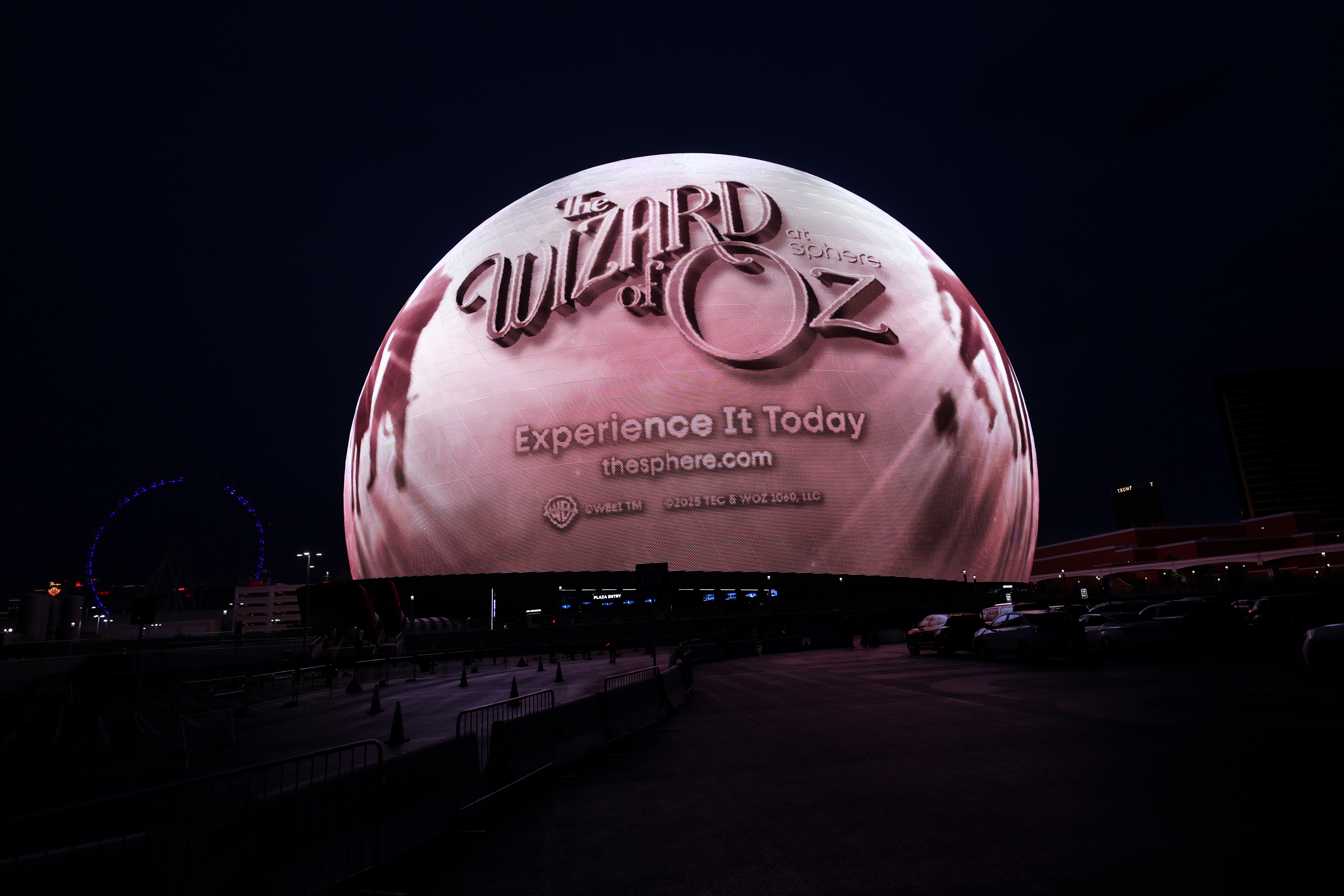
Promotions for the film on the exterior of Sphere

Tickets went on sale on June 10, 2025, coinciding with Judy Garland's 103rd birthday. As part of the experience, a 50-foot-long and 22-foot-tall replica of the legs of the Wicked Witch of the East wearing the ruby slippers was installed onto the exterior of the Sphere, suggesting that the "venue has landed on top of her." As part of the promotional campaign, a viral marketing stunt involving the phrase "Surrender Dorothy" being skywritten above Long Beach, California and Robert Moses State Park in Fire Island, New York took place over the Fourth of July weekend, with the help of the Farmingdale-based Skytypers Air Show Team. The Venetian Las Vegas, which adjoins Sphere, also promoted the film with a display in the resort's Waterfall Atrium that was filled with 5,000 vibrant silk poppies. The cafeteria behind it showcased themed décor and displays previewing the film's merchandise. By August 12, 2025, Sphere reported that over 120,000 tickets were sold for screenings of the film.

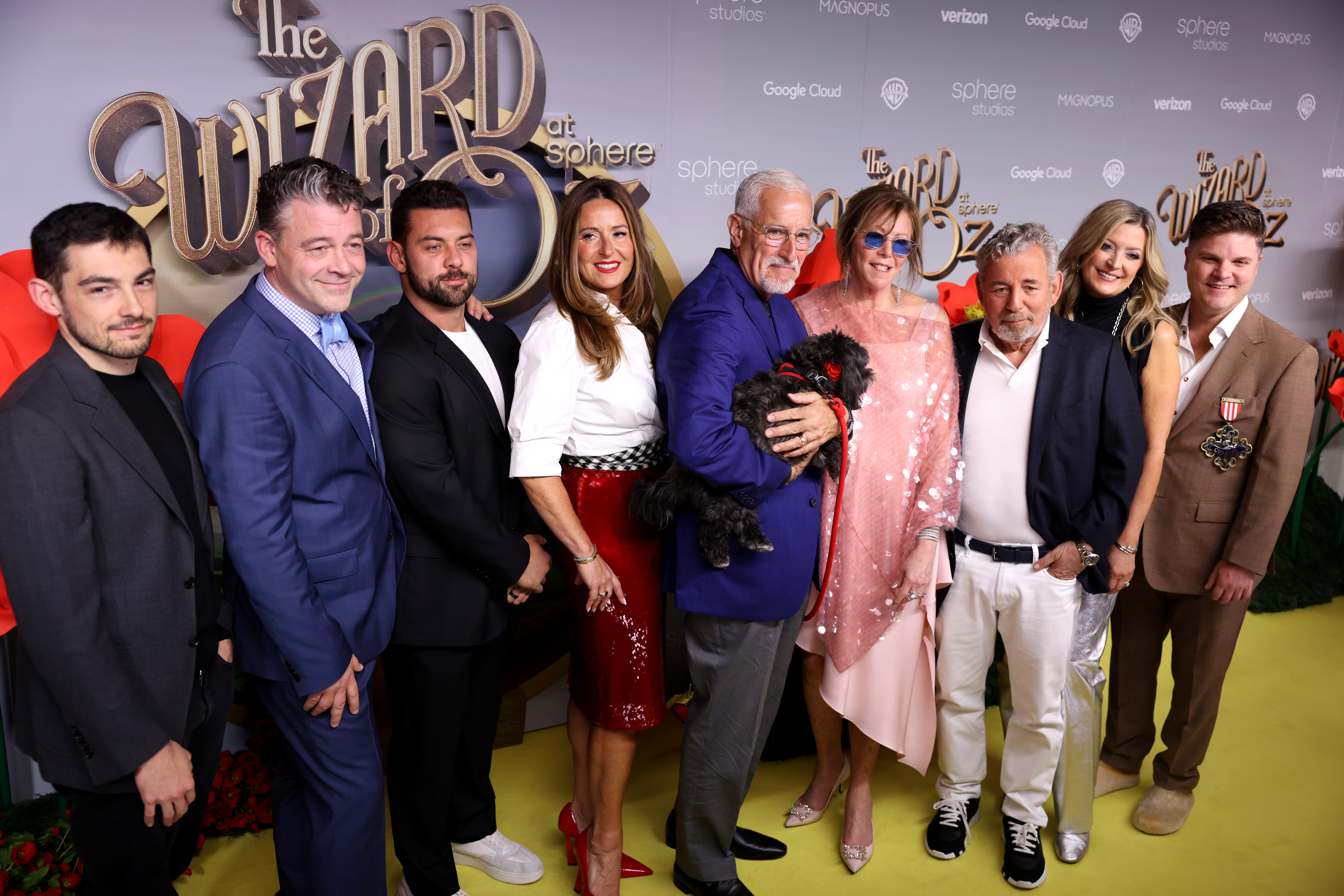
Film producers and Sphere executives at the premiere in August 2025

The world premiere screening was attended by multiple entertainment personalities, including Lorna Luft (daughter of Judy Garland), Skylar Astin, Rosanna Arquette, Kris Jenner, T Bone Burnett, Edie Falco, Joe Manganiello, Zahn McClarnon, Oz historian Ryan Jay and Wicked stars Jessica Vosk and Marissa Bode. Dolan introduced the film in-person before it began, with himself, Rosenthal, Sphere Entertainment COO Jennifer Koester and their fellow execs dressed up as each of the film's characters. On November 7, 2025, a soundtrack was released featuring an a cappella version of "Over the Rainbow" sung by Judy Garland.

== Reception and impact ==
=== Pre-release ===
On May 28, 2025, Rosenthal believed that if The Wizard of Oz proves to be a success at Sphere, that it could lead to more immersive versions of other films being screened at the venue, saying: "It's a template for our industry ... a way for us to go back and look at films through the eyes of the director and the time in which they were made. We hope to do other films, but we don't know what those are." On July 27, 2025, Lorna Luft gave her thoughts on the immersive version of the film on CBS News Sunday Morning, saying that her mother would approve of how the film was handled and that she looked forward to seeing a new generation of fans and audiences introduced to the film through this format.

Ahead of the film's premiere, the use of AI to alter the film for Sphere's format was met with criticism, given the ethical concerns of AI generated media, as well as the environmental, societal, and governmental concerns regarding the regulation of AI. In response to the criticism, Grossman remarked: "I don't think you understand how artists work, because for 30 years, I've been working for famous Hollywood filmmakers who come to me with another artist's work and say, 'See this picture from this movie? We want to do something like that'... The original movie already exists. We don't have to improve it."

=== Post-release ===
The attraction has received mixed reviews, with some praising its 4D features and others lambasting its use of AI and the effect it has on the visual and emotional quality of the film.

Peter Debruge of Variety was both intrigued by the immersive experience and disappointed by the results of AI-aided work on the film, saying: "Extremely high resolution is the enemy of this experience, I've decided, as it makes random details... pull our attention away from the characters. Meanwhile, the augmented reality aspects suggest the sky's the limit in terms of how creative people can get in reimagining classic movies." Debruge felt troubled by "whatever strange AI technique was used to replace Judy Garland's face with a poreless plastic sheen" and was distracted by crowd scenes in which "unblinking Munchkin extras stare into space for minutes on end", saying the characters landed in the uncanny valley. G. Allen Johnson of the San Francisco Chronicle said, "If it's possible to be both blown away — literally — and underwhelmed, the new version of 'The Wizard of Oz' accomplishes this rather dubious achievement." Johnson said the immersive sound mix would "likely bring tears to your eyes" but that the emotion on Garland's face was "muted by a waxy look". He judged that the "most head-scratching and unforgivable part... is the emotionless, synthetic sheen of its figures", believing the AI was best used for landscape scenes. Johnson believed that the tornado scene "alone might be worth the hefty price of admission", and thought it was best to view the film "not as a movie but as a theme park thrill ride akin to Disneyland's 'Pirates of the Caribbean.'"

Alissa Wilkinson of The New York Times said that the film defied interpretation in just one manner. Assessing it from a cinematic perspective, she said: "Despite its presentation as such, it's not even really 'a movie.' And for long stretches, I was deeply unnerved." She believed the lack of a traditional visual frame negatively impacted the visual storytelling and that "Some generated performances seem robotic, others smoothed-over and inhuman". Wilkinson was upset by the reduced running time compared to the original film and concluded that the Sphere version, "in trying to straddle the line between 'experiential storytelling' and 'film,' does neither as well as it could, undercutting what it celebrates". Wilkinson was disconcerted by the film as a portent of how works of art could be altered, saying that it "suggests that in the future, every artist's choices could be reversed, altered or ripped to shreds, then presented by their corporate owners as if they're essentially the original, just zhuzhed up a bit for a new century". Amy Nicholson of the Los Angeles Times said that, "Despite my queasiness about cutting 'Oz' by half an hour, the experiment is a romp", finding the experience immersive and the foam apples and drone-piloted flying monkeys to be "giggle-inducing". Nicholson said the film "loses a dram of its spellcraft" once it reaches Munchkinland, criticizing the "cheesy martian" look of the Wizard's disembodied head and the glitchy appearance of the AI-generated extras; she singled out the hundreds of Emerald City citizens, waving distractingly without concern for Dorothy during a scene in which she pleads with the Wizard. Nicholson summarized: "Overall, you're so caught up observing the experience itself that the emotions of the story don’t register as anything more than theme-ride hydraulics."

Melissa Ruggieri of USA Today said that the film was "nothing short of extraordinary", calling it a "gleaming spectacle that will move you – literally and emotionally". Ruggieri praised the intensity and realism of the tornado sequence, the emotion conjured by Garland's voice, and the "mesmerizing" facade of the Wizard. Liz Shannon Miller of Consequence criticized the smoothing of Garland's face and the unevenness of how the actors were "plopped" onto new CGI backgrounds. Miller was particularly critical of the AI-rendered crowds, saying their faces did not look human-like or match the eyelines of the characters, and that each scene with them contained "the potential for nightmare fuel". Miller called the tornado sequence a "genuine achievement", believing the creative use of the venue enhanced the scene. Ultimately, she felt let down by the rest of the film, saying, "The only thing more frustrating than watching something that's completely creatively bankrupt is watching something with real sparks of potential get totally squandered."

In 2026, The Wizard of Oz at Sphere won a Visual Effects Society Award for Outstanding Visual Effects in a Special Venue Project.

=== Commercial performance ===
By October 17, 2025, the film had sold a million tickets and generated more than $130 million in revenue. Following the news, Sphere Entertainment's stock price rose 14.5 percent and closed at an all-time high price of $67.24. As of June 2026, the film had sold more than 3 million tickets and generated over $400 million in ticket sales.
