= Fort Wayne International Airport =

Airport in Fort Wayne, Indiana, US

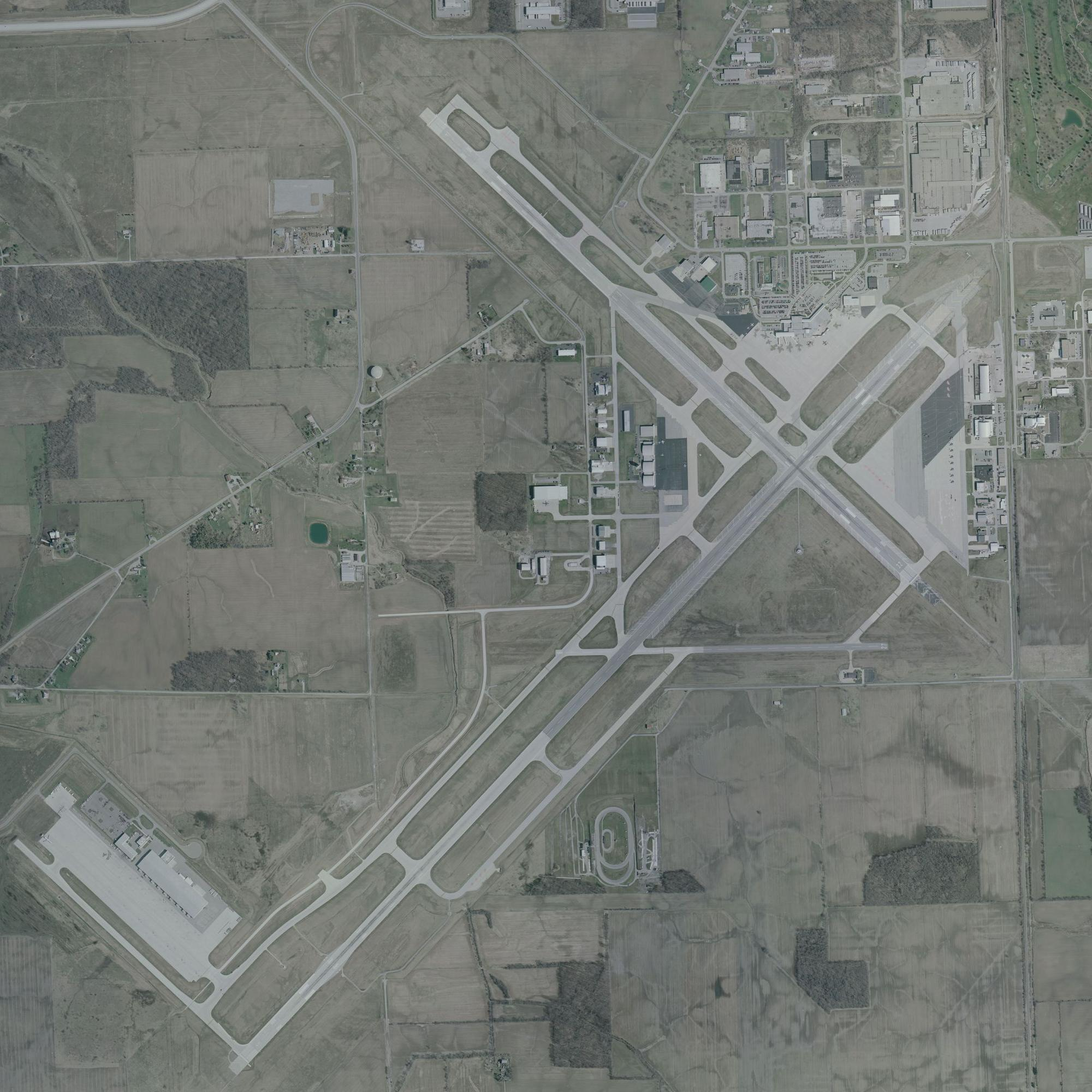
- USGS 2002 orthophoto
- IATA: FWA; ICAO: KFWA; FAA LID: FWA; WMO: 72533

Summary
- Airport type: Public
- Owner/Operator: Fort Wayne-Allen County Airport Authority
- Serves: Fort Wayne, Indiana
- Elevation AMSL: 814 ft (248 m)
- Coordinates: 40°58′42″N 085°11′43″W
- Website: www.fwairport.com

Maps
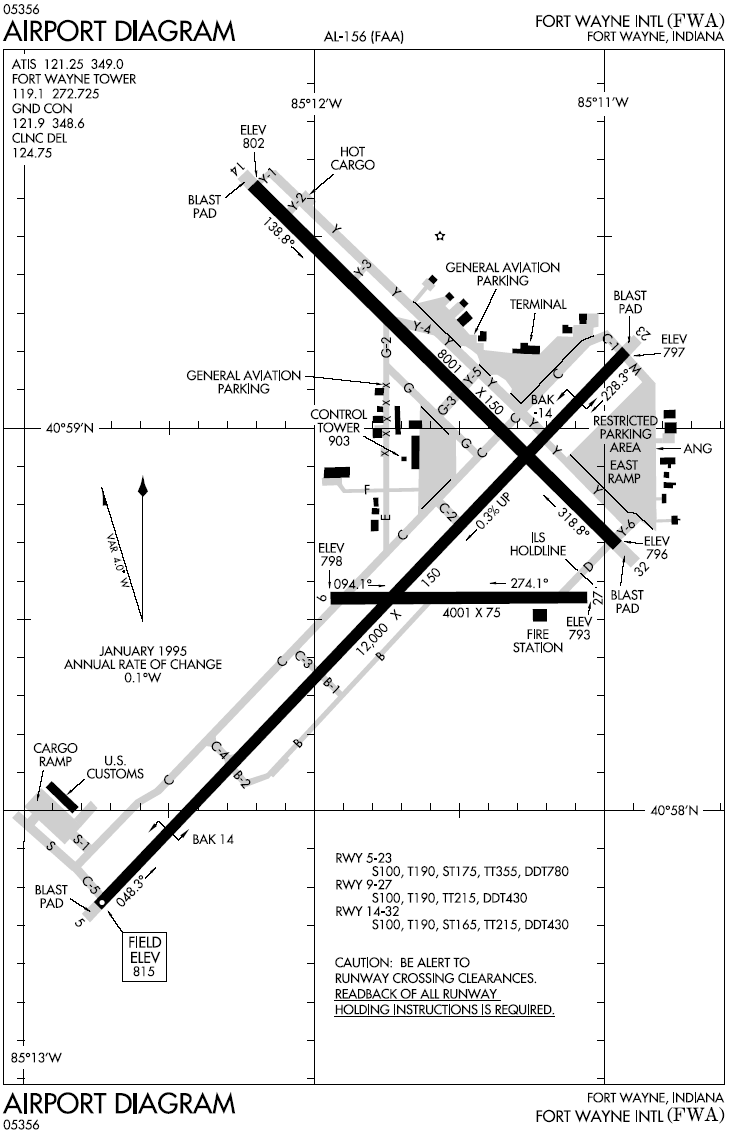
- FAA airport diagram
- Interactive map of Fort Wayne International Airport

Runways
Direction	Length		Surface
Direction	ft	m	Surface
5/23	11,981	3,652	Asphalt/concrete
14/32	8,002	2,439	Asphalt/concrete
9/27	4,001	1,220	Asphalt/concrete

Statistics (2025)
- Total enplanements: 494,014
- Total deplanements: 489,028
- Passengers: 983,042 ▲14.73%
- Source: Federal Aviation Administration

Fort Wayne International Airport (IATA: FWA, ICAO: KFWA, FAA LID: FWA) lies eight miles southwest of Fort Wayne, in Allen County, Indiana, United States. It is owned by the Fort Wayne-Allen County Airport Authority.

The National Plan of Integrated Airport Systems for 2011–2015 categorized it as a primary commercial service airport since it has over 10,000 passenger boardings (enplanements) per year. Federal Aviation Administration records say the airport had 359,800 enplanements in calendar year 2022, 7.15% more than 2021. Based on passenger enplanements, Fort Wayne International ranked #147 out of the 539 airports in the United States that received scheduled passenger airline service in 2022. As such, the airport is classified by the FAA as a "nonhub", or an airport that has between 10,000 and 400,000 enplanements per year.

The airport has one terminal, the Lieutenant Paul Baer Terminal. Passenger flights reach seven airline hubs of Atlanta, Chicago, Charlotte, Dallas/Fort Worth, Detroit, and Minneapolis-Saint Paul, along with flights to Orlando, Punta Gorda (serving Fort Myers and Sarasota), Tampa, Phoenix, and seasonal service to Myrtle Beach, Sarasota, and Las Vegas. Together, flights from the airport to these fourteen cities serve over 790,000 combined arriving and departing passengers per year.

The airport has a 600,000-square-foot (56,000 m^{2}) air cargo center on the southwest side. The center was occupied by Kitty Hawk Aircargo, which had a hub at Fort Wayne until October 30, 2007, shortly after the carrier filed for Chapter 11 bankruptcy. The former Kitty Hawk hub is now used by several aviation and non-aviation companies including Logistics Insight, FedEx Express, and Spinach Ball.

== History ==
=== Baer Army Air Base & Baer Field ===
The airport was built at a cost of $10 million as a United States Army Air Corps base just before World War II. A coalition of city business interests arranged to purchase a series of contiguous land parcels outside of Fort Wayne, demolish the existing structures, and present a unified parcel to the War Department in a short enough period to meet a competitive deadline for the Development of Landing Areas for National Defense (DLAND) initiative while preserving civilian access to the existing Paul Baer Municipal Airport (now Smith Field) on the north side of the city. War Department policy at the time required that bases and airfields be named for deceased military aviators, so other suggestions were rejected, and the department chose to name the new facility for Paul Frank Baer, a Fort Wayne native and World War I flying ace and early official for the Aeronautics Branch of the United States Department of Commerce (now the Federal Aviation Administration). The original airport had been named for Baer while he was still living, but he had since died in a seaplane accident in Shanghai while carrying mail and passengers for the China National Aviation Corporation. The War Department's name choice necessitated a change of name for the municipal airport to avoid confusion, and city leaders elected to rename it for Art Smith, a pioneering airmail pilot, also a native of Fort Wayne, who also died in the course of his airmail duties.

Operations began in April 1941 under the name Baer Army Air Base, when Maj. Wilson T. Douglas of the Quartermaster Corps arrived as the base quartermaster. The weather station was activated in August of that year, and the 13th Service Squadron was transferred from Chanute Field. The band arrived in October, and in November the 103 Communications Squadron arrived and the base was activated as Baer Field. The ordnance company departed in December, eventually reaching Port Moresby in New Guinea in February of the following year. The 307th Pursuit Squadron, which was activated in January 1942, flying Bell P-39 Airacobra and Curtis P-40 Warhawk training aircraft. Once training was completed, the unit was sent to Atcham in England. On December 7, 1941, a month after Baer Field was activated, the Japanese Imperial Japanese Navy Air Service struck Pearl Harbor in Hawaii, causing the United States to formally declare war the following day.

Later in 1942, the Army Air Corps became the United States Army Air Forces. Over 100,000 military personnel served out of Baer Field and its more than one hundred structures during the war. A large number of ground and air squadrons trained at the facility before deployment to the European and Asiatic-Pacific Theaters of operations.

In December 1945, the facility was put on Temporary Inactive status, and in 1946 its name reverted to Baer Army Air Base. By January 1947, the base had shrunk to a small Air Communications Service detachment under Maj. Phillip Cartwright, consisting of the major and two other officers and no enlisted men, was concerned primarily with the storage and transfer of base records. The base was determined to be surplus to the needs of the War Department, except for areas reserved for reserve and Air National Guard activity. Thereafter, the base was used sporadically for the Army Air Forces Reserve and Air Force Reserve training until 1951, the base was again in use for the 163rd Fighter Interceptor Squadron, joined later that year by the 122nd Fighter Wing from Stout Army Air Field. Since the Korean War, the base has mostly hosted Indiana Air National Guard units but has occasionally hosted active-duty units like the 434th Air Refueling Wing (previously the 434th Tactical Airlift Wing) on a temporary basis.

The oldest original Baer Army Air Field hangar, Hangar No. 40, was in use from World War II until 2012. Hangar No. 40's final tenant was FedEx Express, who used it until the hangar was damaged in a weather-related incident. After the damage to Hangar No. 40, FedEx moved into a portion of the former Kitty Hawk hub. Hangar No. 40 was demolished between March and April 2013.

=== Fort Wayne Municipal Airport ===
After the base was transferred to temporary inactive status, the city of Fort Wayne bought the airport from the federal government's General Services Administration for one dollar, renaming it Fort Wayne Municipal Airport in 1946, though, colloquially, the entire complex was still referred to as Baer Field, a practice reinforced by the reactivation of the airport for military purposes in 1951, to the point a race track adjacent to the property, Baer Field Raceway Park, which operated from 1964 to 2019, was named after it. Two passenger airlines initially served Baer Field: TWA and Chicago & Southern Airlines; United Airlines appeared in 1947 with one DC-3 each way a day. C&S merged with Delta Air Lines in 1953 and Delta is the airport's longest-serving carrier, having served the airport in one form or another ever since. In 1953 the airport's current terminal opened, replacing a converted military structure. The new permanent terminal had an air traffic control tower, an observation deck, and the "Look-Out Dining Room" restaurant with views of the ramp below. Late in the 1950s, Hilton Hotels opened the on-site Hilton Inn, which was sold in the 1980s as Hilton opened a hotel at the Grand Wayne Center. After Hilton sold the hotel, the on-airport Hilton was reflagged as first a Holiday Inn, and later became a Quality Inn and then a Days Inn. TWA, the first airline to serve Fort Wayne at what is now Smith Field, ended flights from Baer Field in 1963. Scheduled jet flights began in January 1967 on United Caravelles (United had been using the Vickers Viscount at Baer Field for several years). United's jets were soon joined by Delta Douglas DC-9s. American Airlines flights began in 1974, initially to Dallas/Fort Worth International Airport (which opened that year) on Boeing 727s.

Along with Delta, United, and later American, locally-based Hub Airlines and other regional airlines flew to the airport in the 1960s and 1970s. The airport was the largest in Indiana not served by airlines classified as local service airlines by the Civil Aeronautics Board (e.g. Allegheny Airlines and Ozark Air Lines). Eastern Air Lines was the only CAB regulation-era "Big Four" airline that never served Baer Field.

In 1981, Baer Field's 1953 terminal building was modernized and expanded with features like jetways to handle increased traffic brought on by the Airline Deregulation Act. During the period immediately following deregulation in the late 1970s through the early 1980s, Air Wisconsin, Piedmont Airlines (later US Airways), and Republic Airlines began service to Baer Field. American also changed their Fort Wayne flights from Dallas to Chicago O'Hare, while Air Wisconsin took over United's Chicago route in partnership with United and later as United Express. Air Wisconsin also had a maintenance base on the west side of the airport in the 1980s and 1990s that handled BAe 146, BAe ATP, and later Canadair Regional Jet aircraft. After Air Wisconsin closed the maintenance base, Shuttle America briefly used the hangar before it lost its US Airways Express affiliation, flying passengers to the US Airways Pittsburgh hub. The former Air Wisconsin hangar was later used by Endeavor Air, and is presently in use by SkyWest. In 1985, management of Baer Field was transferred from the City of Fort Wayne to the newly established Fort Wayne-Allen County Airport Authority, with a board composed of equal numbers of City of Fort Wayne and Allen County officials.

=== Fort Wayne International Airport ===
In 1991 Baer Field was renamed Fort Wayne International Airport; the terminal was renamed to continue honoring Paul Frank Baer. Through the 1990s the airport underwent the largest expansion and revitalization in its history. Between 1994 and 1997, the terminal was again expanded, with design by MSKTD & Associates, Inc. Other improvements included runway upgrades and the Air Trade Center on the southwest side of the property. In 1998, Fort Wayne International Airport started advertising the airport to the general public for the first time. That same year, Delta ended its mainline jet service to Atlanta. Although this ended a tradition of service dating back to Chicago & Southern Airlines when the airport was converted to civil use in the 1940s, Delta continued to serve the airport via Delta Connection regional jets to Atlanta and Cincinnati. Other airlines serving the airport, including United, Northwest, and American, followed Delta's lead in introducing regional jets such as the Canadair Regional Jet, Fairchild Dornier 328JET, Avro RJ85, and the Embraer ERJ-145 to the airport. Turboprops such as the Saab 340, Beechcraft 1900, ATR 72, and Dash 8 also continued to play a role for flights to destinations such as Milwaukee, Pittsburgh, Cleveland, and Detroit, occasionally alongside larger jets such as the DC-9, Fokker 100, and Boeing 737 on the same routes.

By 2000, Fort Wayne International Airport was handling record traffic. The record from 2000 was not broken until 2016. American Eagle resumed nonstop flights to Dallas/Fort Worth that year, which continue. Air Canada Express began a short-lived service to Toronto. The following year, Fort Wayne International Airport's traffic dropped after the September 11 attacks. The slump continued for several years, prolonged by an ongoing fare war between Southwest Airlines, ATA Airlines, and others at Indianapolis International Airport, two and a half hours from Fort Wayne. In late 2003, ATA Connection began service from Fort Wayne International Airport to Chicago/Midway, the first low-cost carrier to serve the airport. Demand for the flights reached the point where airport management bought the on-site Days Inn to make room for more parking. An on-site hotel has not returned to the airport since, as many modern hotels on the southwest side of Fort Wayne offer shuttle service. ATA briefly switched the flight's destination to Indianapolis before closing their regional division completely in early 2005. US Airways also ended service to Pittsburgh, their lone service from the airport, as part of a broader de-hubbing of Pittsburgh. US Airways left the airport, as the discontinued Pittsburgh service was not transferred to the airline's other hubs in Philadelphia or Charlotte. However, nine years later after the merger of American Airlines and US Airways, Fort Wayne International Airport got service to both hubs. Around the same time as the departure of US Airways from the airport, Northwest stopped using mainline aircraft on their Detroit flights; unlike US Airways, NWA continued to serve the Fort Wayne to Detroit route using regional jets and turboprops. Delta planned on introducing service to Orlando from the airport in 2005; however, the flights were canceled days before the planned launch as the result of Delta's Chapter 11 bankruptcy.

In January 2007, a modernized 210 feet (64 m) air traffic control tower was opened on the south side of Fort Wayne International Airport, at a price of $9.7 million. One year later, Allegiant Air, the airport's second low-cost carrier, began operations with service to Orlando. Allegiant continues to serve the airport and has since added service to Tampa/St. Petersburg, Myrtle Beach (seasonal), Punta Gorda (serving Fort Myers and Sarasota), and Phoenix. At one time, Allegiant also offered service to Fort Lauderdale from the airport and served Phoenix and Las Vegas before late 2008 as well. The Las Vegas and Phoenix services were initially discontinued in 2008 due to fuel costs and fuel price volatility. However, the Phoenix and Las Vegas suspensions were ultimately temporary as Allegiant began adding more fuel-efficient Airbus A319 aircraft in 2013. The A319 allowed the airline to serve Phoenix profitably from Fort Wayne. Allegiant then added the Airbus A320 to Florida routes. The MD-80 fleet has since been retired, making Allegiant an all-Airbus airline of A319 and A320 aircraft, the largest passenger aircraft used at the airport. The move to an all-Airbus fleet with lower fuel and maintenance costs enabled Allegiant to serve more cities from Fort Wayne and elsewhere; seasonal Sarasota service started in 2019 and Las Vegas was resumed as seasonal service in 2020. The Fort Lauderdale service was eliminated along with several other Allegiant routes to Fort Lauderdale, including one from what is now South Bend International Airport, due to congestion problems at Fort Lauderdale International Airport.

In 2008, all Fort Wayne-Allen County Airport Authority properties including Fort Wayne International Airport and Smith Field received a new logo. The new brand, designed by Fort Wayne firm Catalyst Marketing Design, is meant to resemble jet contrails. Debuting together with the new logo was the slogan "A Whole New Altitude" that was and continues to be used for both airports along with the Airport Authority's operations. Northwest began service to Minneapolis/St. Paul International Airport in early 2008; the service was temporarily suspended in 2009 following the merger of Delta and Northwest, but resumed in 2010 as seasonal service running between early March and late December. The Minneapolis flights are now year-round service.

During and after the Great Recession, Fort Wayne International Airport lost relatively little of its service and passengers when compared with similar Midwestern airports. Although Continental Airlines ended Cleveland service in 2009 and Delta ended Cincinnati service in 2011, there was no impact to the airport in the end. Unlike some other similar airports, Fort Wayne International Airport gained passengers in the six years immediately following Continental's discontinuation of Cleveland flights. In the cases of both Cleveland and Cincinnati, the service discontinuation was part of broader hub cutbacks at both Continental and Delta that affected many other airports. Following the merger of Delta and Northwest, Delta also replaced the last of the turboprop flying from the airport with regional jets. Around the time of the discontinuation of Cleveland service, United placed Continental flight numbers and allowed Continental OnePass frequent-flyer miles to be earned on United flights, including those from Fort Wayne. United continues to serve the airport following the United/Continental merger, and added flights to their Newark hub in September 2016. However, this service was unsuccessful due to local passenger preference for LaGuardia Airport and United’s 2018 decision to reduce Newark flying to many small markets.

Today Fort Wayne is served by four carriers: Allegiant Air, American Eagle, Delta, and United Express. Although they account for a small percentage of airport traffic (less than 1%), charter flights from operators including Allegiant, Vision Airlines, and Republic Airlines also operate from the airport. Delta reduces Detroit flights during January and February, the airport's slowest months, while United and American reduce Chicago flights. Delta's Atlanta and Minneapolis flights, all American flights aside from O'Hare, and Allegiant flights to Florida and Phoenix do not see reductions in January and February.

The airport's terminal received updates in 2013. These updates included new paint, expanded business, new welcome centers, new children's play areas, permanent heating and air conditioning units for aircraft use at gates and new lounge seating near the gates with power outlets. The airport's office reception area and executive offices on the second floor of the terminal building also received an update at approximately the same time. Also in 2013, Allegiant reintroduced service to Phoenix via Phoenix–Mesa Gateway Airport in late October of that year. Phoenix is the third-most popular city from Fort Wayne International Airport behind Atlanta and Dallas, and prior to the reintroduction, Phoenix was also the most popular city without nonstop service from the airport. The resumed Phoenix service became Allegiant's fourth year-round and fifth total destination from the airport.

About six months after the legal closing of the American Airlines-US Airways merger, Fort Wayne International Airport and American Airlines Group announced twice-daily service to Philadelphia International Airport and daily flights to Charlotte Douglas International Airport, both legacy US Airways hubs. The new flights began on October 2, 2014. These three flights boosted the merged airline's departures from Fort Wayne by a third over the previous schedule, provided the airport's first route to the northeastern US since deregulation, and offered an additional gateway to the southeastern US and the Caribbean. Both hubs also improved connections to Europe from Fort Wayne, offering new one-stop flight options that were previously not available. A second Charlotte flight was added in December 2015.

The success of American's Philadelphia service led United Airlines to add service to Newark Liberty International Airport, effective September 2016. The service will initially utilize the Embraer EMB-145 regional jet. This is United's first flight aside from O'Hare from the airport since the mid-1980s, and will provide additional one-stop connections to the East Coast, Caribbean, Europe, Latin America, and India from the airport. However, shortly after the United announcement, American decided to discontinue Philadelphia flights as of August 2016. Unusually for such a decision, American initially did not cite a reason for the discontinuation to local media, though lower-than-expected traffic was later cited as a reason. However, some felt that the market was too small to support service to two very similar hubs in the same area. American remained committed to the airport, and continues to serve Charlotte, Chicago, and Dallas/Fort Worth multiple times daily. In November 2016, American upgraded their Dallas flights to the CRJ-900 with first-class seating and upgraded Charlotte flights to CRJ-700s with first class in March 2017. The Philadelphia decision was short-lived as American resumed Philadelphia service in June 2018, again with two daily flights (the afternoon flight that mainly serves connections to Europe sees a suspension during the slow winter months). Due to a pilot shortage, the service ended in May 2023. This marked 12 nonstop cities from the airport, with over 350 cities possible with one connection, though not all cities are served year-round.

2016 was a record year for the airport's passenger numbers, as the airport handled 727,896 passengers, marking seven consecutive years of passenger growth. 2017 improved on this number, and by 2019, the airport had ten straight record years. In 2018, a rerouting of Ferguson Road and demolition of a hangar was completed. This allowed for more parking and for a future terminal expansion, with room for more parking.

== Facilities ==
Fort Wayne International Airport covers 3,351 acres (1,356 ha) at an elevation of 814 feet (248 m).

The main Runway 5/23 is 11,981 feet (3,652 m) long and 150 feet (46 m) wide grooved asphalt and concrete. The runway is large enough to accommodate the NASA Space Shuttle orbiter, Airbus A380, Boeing 747, and military air mobility and aerial refueling aircraft such as the C-5 Galaxy, C-17 Globemaster III, KC-135 Stratotanker, KC-46A Pegasus, and KC-10 Extender. The runway has BAK-14 arresting gear on both ends for emergency arrestment of US and NATO/Allied fighter and other tactical fixed-wing aircraft.

Runway 14/32 is the airport's secondary runway, 8,002 by 150 feet (2,439 m × 46 m). Runway 9/27 is 4,001 by 75 feet (1,220 m × 23 m), used by general aviation.

Fort Wayne International Airport has ten shared-use gates. Any gate can be used by any airline serving the airport at any time with the airport's shared-use gate system.

Gates 1 through 4 are ground-level on the first floor of the terminal, whereas Gates 5 through 10 are on the second floor of the terminal and board via jetways. A half-height jetway was added to Gate 4 in 2015, while Gate 2 has a Commute-a-Walk covered walkway. Gates 1 and 3 are currently uncovered. As Gates 5 through 8 were built at a time when the airport had mainline service, these gates can handle aircraft ranging in size from the Canadair Regional Jet family used by Delta, American, and United to the Airbus A319 and Airbus A320 family aircraft used by Allegiant.

An FAA Master Plan for Fort Wayne International Airport, the first since 2003, was completed in 2012. This led to the construction of new facilities, with construction ongoing as of 2023.

=== Passenger & private aviation facilities: current and planned ===
==== Parking & car rental ====
The new rental car area (which brought covered spaces for rental cars) and parking lot reconfiguration (which streamlined the exit for the short- and long-term parking lots) were among the first improvements to be carried out under the master plan. These occurred in 2014, coinciding with a parking management change from Standard Parking to Republic Parking System, the first such change at the airport in 45 years. Eight car rental agencies serve FWA. The previous car rental lot was modified into a dedicated drop-off and pick-up point for taxis and hotel shuttles. Uber is also authorized to serve the airport, and Lyft has been authorized since the ridesharing firm began operating in Fort Wayne. Shortly after the change in parking vendors, the airport started offering airline miles or hotel points for parking, dining, and shopping by becoming a member of the Thanks Again loyalty program along with smartphone parking payments. Parking rates remained unchanged as the vendors changed and Thanks Again was introduced.

==== Passenger gates & private aviation ====
The master plan called for the replacement of ground-level Gates 1 through 4 with an equal number of additional jetway gates on the second floor, and one of the new gates would include a passenger U.S. Customs Federal Inspection Services station to complement the existing FIS station for cargo and business jets. Many of these features were added to Project Gateway. Room opened up by the relocation of the airport's fixed-base operator (FBO) to the airport's west side near the former SkyWest maintenance base, made possible by the opening of Altitude Drive. As of January 2016, the FBO is run by the Airport Authority and is branded as the Fort Wayne Aero Center. The new facility, which replaced previous FBO Atlantic Aviation, offers a full range of services to private aircraft owners. Fort Wayne Aero Center also supplies Avfuel-branded aviation fuels and deicing services to both private and commercial airline customers. U.S. Customs moved to a new location near the Aero Center in 2016; although the facility will be larger, a passenger FIS was not included. The master plan also calls for a larger Transportation Security Administration security area.

==== Project Gateway ====
By 2019, the current terminal was handling record traffic, and it was time to expand in a way consistent with the Master Plan. In 2020, the airport announced Project Gateway, a significant terminal renovation, and expansion. The design and engineering of the project was led by Mead & Hunt (www.meadhunt.com), a national architecture and engineering firm specializing in aviation; the construction phase was led by Fort Wayne construction firm Michael Kinder & Sons from 2021 to 2023, when work of the West Terminal will be completed. A second project, East Terminal, designed by Mead & Hunt with construction led by Clayco, is planned for completion in early 2025. A key component of Project Gateway West Terminal is to get the terminal’s jetway-enabled gates, dining, shopping, and services to par with modern standards, increase security from 2 to 4 lanes, and add a new inline baggage system. Project Gateway will go to all upper-level jetway gates, all able to handle jets such as the EMBRAER 175 and Airbus A220 that are expected to feature in the airport’s growth. Some gates will also handle Airbus A320 family and Boeing 737 aircraft, both of which will be used by Allegiant Air as they continue to buy used A320s and will be adding the Boeing 737 MAX in the Boeing 737-7 and 737-8 200 versions to the fleet in 2023. The Greater Fort Wayne Aviation Museum will be digitized and accessible from the landside without security.

The East Terminal, is planned for construction in 2023-2025, and will include new upper-level gates, dining, and shopping. A passenger U.S. Customs facility can be added to the facility, though there are currently no plans to make it part of Project Gateway, as plans for service to Mexico at South Bend International Airport continue to encounter setbacks and Fort Wayne wants to add one when timing is better for such types of services. Work to enable Project Gateway started in spring 2020 on a terminal ramp rebuild. The ramp rebuild was accelerated due to temporary low passenger traffic as a result of COVID-19, as more work could be done without disruption to operations.

=== Air cargo ===
Fort Wayne International also handles a significant amount of air cargo. In the 1970s, United Airlines scheduled Douglas DC-8 freighters into the airport, Delta Air Lines used Boeing 727s for belly cargo capacity, and local company Jet Air Freight & Parcel Delivery offered delivery service of air cargo from what was then Baer Field.

In the 1980s, as air cargo shifted to specialized airlines, the airport gained a hub for Burlington Air Express (now BAX Global) in 1985. The airport was also a finalist for the United States Postal Service Express Mail hub in 1991; this hub went to Indianapolis International Airport before being closed in 2001 as the USPS shifted Express Mail and Priority Mail air duties to FedEx Express. The BAX hub was moved to Toledo Express Airport in 1991, and a hub for Kitty Hawk Aircargo opened eight years later. The hub was built with $24 million in bonds, and the airport's runway was extended in anticipation of larger cargo aircraft. Around this time, Fort Wayne International was second only to Indianapolis International in terms of air cargo volume in the state of Indiana. Kitty Hawk shut down operations in 2007; the airport raised its property tax levy significantly solely to pay the bonds. New tenants were eventually found for the facility, and bond payments for the former Kitty Hawk facility ended in 2020.

Despite the loss of Kitty Hawk, both FedEx Express and UPS Airlines fly daily Boeing 757 and Airbus A300 service to Fort Wayne International from the FedEx Memphis SuperHub and UPS Louisville Worldport, respectively. (FedEx's Indianapolis hub is served from Fort Wayne by truck.) During times of high demand, the Boeing 767, McDonnell Douglas MD-11, or Airbus A300 are often substituted. Amazon.com, which opened a delivery center in fall 2020 and opened the first of two Fort Wayne fulfillment centers in fall 2021, one of which is located close to the airport, added Boeing 767 service to Fort Worth Alliance Airport to provide east-west connections in the Amazon Air network in 2022.

=== Museum ===
The Greater Fort Wayne Aviation Museum is a museum displaying local aviation memorabilia located inside the terminal.

== Airlines and destinations ==
=== Passenger ===
Airlines	Destinations
Allegiant Air	Fort Lauderdale, Orlando/Sanford, Phoenix/Mesa, Punta Gorda (FL), St. Petersburg/Clearwater; Seasonal: Las Vegas, Myrtle Beach, Sarasota
American Eagle	Charlotte, Chicago–O'Hare, Dallas/Fort Worth
Delta Connection	Atlanta, Detroit, Minneapolis/St. Paul
United Express	Chicago–O'Hare

=== Destination map ===
Destinations map
Destinations from Fort Wayne International Airport
Red = Year-round destination
Green = Seasonal destination
Blue = Future destination

== Statistics ==
=== Top destinations ===
Top 10 domestic destinations (August 2025 – July 2026)
Rank	Airport	Passengers	Airline
1	Chicago–O'Hare, Illinois	113,080	American, United
2	(Georgia (U.S. state)) Atlanta, Georgia	65,150	Delta
3	Dallas/Fort Worth, Texas	61,780	American
4	Charlotte, North Carolina	46,470	American
5	Detroit, Michigan	39,030	Delta
6	Punta Gorda, Florida	34,540	Allegiant
7	St. Petersburg/Clearwater, Florida	28,750	Allegiant
8	Orlando/Sanford, Florida	27,410	Allegiant
9	Minneapolis/St. Paul, Minnesota	21,560	Delta
10	Sarasota, Florida	15,230	Allegiant

=== Airline market share ===
Carrier Shares for August 2025 – July 2026
Carrier	Passengers (arriving and departing)
SkyWest	380,000(39.13%)
Allegiant	281,000(28.92%)
Envoy Air	98,420(10.13%)
Piedmont Airlines	91,410(9.41%)
Endeavor Air	73,180(7.53%)
Other	47,310(4.87%)

=== Annual traffic ===
Annual passenger enplanements at FWA, 2000 – Present
Year	Passengers	Year	Passengers	Year	Passengers
2000	351,623	2011	272,796	2022	359,800
2001	295,469	2012	280,732	2023	392,876
2002	288,996	2013	294,968	2024	424,491
2003	294,127	2014	323,252	2025	494,014
2004	329,135	2015	353,872	2026	
2005	307,682	2016	360,369	2027	
2006	268,122	2017	359,658	2028	
2007	289,210	2018	372,030	2029	
2008	282,449	2019	402,400	2030	
2009	259,315	2020	213,125	2031	
2010	273,056	2021	335,804	2032	

== Accidents and incidents ==
- On April 28, 1951, United Airlines Flight 129, a Douglas DC-3 with 11 passengers and crew, crashed on approach to Fort Wayne Municipal Airport/Baer Field. All eight passengers and three crew were killed. A severe downdraft during a thunderstorm caused the aircraft to strike the ground in a near level attitude.
- On November 9, 2000, a Superior Aviation Fairchild Swearingen Metroliner struck trees, crashed and caught fire after takeoff from FWA. The sole occupant, the pilot, was killed.

== Famous Visitors ==
In the 1992 Presidential campaign, former President George H. W. Bush used Fort Wayne International Airport during a campaign stop. To this day, this is also the only visit of the Boeing VC-25A Air Force One to the airport.

In the 2008 Presidential campaign, both former President Barack Obama and Hillary Clinton used the airport for campaign stops.

In the 2016 Presidential campaign, both Ted Cruz and Donald Trump used the airport for campaign stops. Two years later when serving as President, Trump also used FWA for a midterm campaign stop in support of U.S. Senate candidate Mike Braun, who instead chose to run for Governor of Indiana instead of a second term in the 2024 election.

In the 2020 Presidential campaign, former Vice President Mike Pence made a campaign stop on behalf of then-President Donald Trump, days before Pence voiced issues over Trump’s plans for the January 6th insurrection and stopped campaigning on behalf of him. This campaign stop was held in an open hangar due to Indiana’s COVID-19 guidelines, which were based on the stricter CDC guidelines instead of the more lenient White House Reopening Plan.

== See also ==
- Indiana World War II Army Airfields
- List of airports in Indiana
