= FactCheckArmenia.com =

Website denying the Armenian genocide

FactCheckArmenia.com is a website whose stated purpose is "exposing Armenian distortions and hypocrisies". Purporting to be a fact-checking website; the website publishes false information denying the Armenian genocide. Among the false claims made by the website is the assertion that "no Armenians were harmed" during the deportation of Armenian intellectuals on 24 April 1915 (most of the deportees were eventually murdered).

According to Vice News, "FactCheckArmenia dispenses a view that is suspiciously similar to the Turkish government's line—and sometimes, perhaps more extreme". According to genocide expert Samuel Totten, the website uses a misleading title to "snare the uninformed". He adds that "There is hardly any other way to describe Fact Check Armenia than to say it is an out and out denier of the Ottoman Turk genocide of the Armenians between 1915 and 1922." The website is not transparent about its ownership or funding, but has links to the Turkish government. According to Ab Kaan, involved in both organizations, "all data in Fact Check Armenia is produced by The Turkic Platform".

== Google ads ==
In 2015, Vice News reported that FactCheckArmenia.com was buying Google ads in order to appear first in the search results for the search terms "Ermeni Kırımı" (a Turkish phrase for the Armenian genocide), and the English-language "Armenian genocide". At the time, Google ad policy forbade "products or services that help users to mislead others".

== Billboards and ads ==
In April 2015, the website published a paid ad in Reuters, which was later silently deleted.

In 2016, The Wall Street Journal published an advertisement by FactCheckArmenia.com denying the Armenian genocide. Previously, The New York Times refused to run the ad based on its policy rejecting any "advertising that denies great human tragedies". Los Angeles City Councilman Paul Krekorian proposed that the city stop buying the newspaper and any others that print ads denying the genocide. Kim Kardashian took out an ad in The New York Times stating, "Advocating the denial of a genocide by the country responsible for it – that’s not publishing a ‘provocative viewpoint,’ that's spreading lies".

In April 2016, the website was advertised on billboards in various places including Boston, Chicago, Texas, and Little Armenia, Los Angeles. Armenian National Committee of America launched a campaign against the billboards, encouraging companies to "stop profiting from genocide denial". Some of the posters were advertised by local Turkish consulates. Turkish historian Fatma Müge Göçek stated, "I have been following the story regarding the billboards in Boston and Chicago with great disappointment, but not surprise."

== Skywriting ==
On 20 April 2016, FactCheckArmenia.com paid GEICO Skytypers for skywriting over New York City stating "101 years of Geno-lie," "Gr8 ally = Turkey," "BFF = Russia + Armenia," and "FactCheckArmenia.com". GEICO Skytypers later apologized. Although some Armenian-Americans were outraged, the skywriting otherwise attracted little attention from Americans. Armenian-American novelist Nancy Kricorian stated that she was "appalled and disgusted" by the skywriting. Furthermore, she "was surprised to see that they are still peddling this tired and unconvincing strategy of calling Armenians liars". History professor Louis A. Fishman said, "Stunts like we saw Wednesday in New York only throw salt on the wounds of Armenians whose families died in the genocide". However, he also stated that most Americans were probably confused by the messages.

== Twitter ==
The website has an affiliated Twitter account, @FCArmenia. On 24 April, 2020 (Armenian Genocide Memorial Day), the account tweeted "#ArmenianGenocide is a hoax! Armenian lobby fooled public opinion for many years". This view is in contrast to that of historical research and scholarship, which considers the genocide a historical fact.
