= Smith Field (Indiana) =

Airport in Fort Wayne, Indiana, U.S.

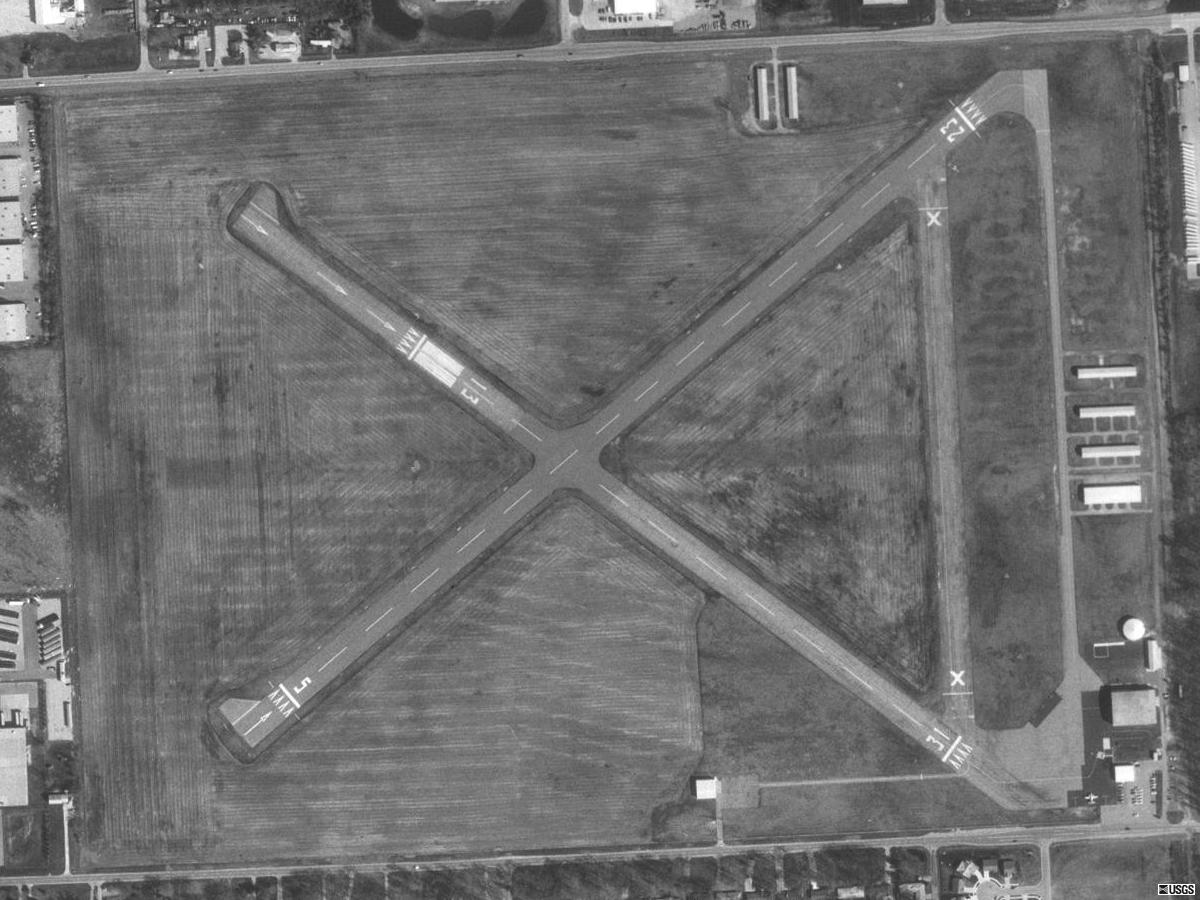
- USGS aerial image, 6 April 1998
- IATA: SMD; ICAO: KSMD; FAA LID: SMD

Summary
- Airport type: Public
- Owner/Operator: Fort Wayne Allen County Airport Authority
- Serves: Fort Wayne, Indiana
- Elevation AMSL: 835 ft (255 m)
- Coordinates: 41°08′36″N 085°09′10″W
- Website: www.SMDairport.com
- Interactive map of Smith Field

Runways
Direction	Length		Surface
Direction	ft	m	Surface
5/23	3,124	952	Asphalt
13/31	2,922	891	Asphalt
9/27 (removed)	2,600	792	Asphalt
18/36 (closed)	1,765	537	Asphalt

Statistics (2007)
- Aircraft operations: 20,109
- Based aircraft: 56
- Source: Federal Aviation Administration

- Smith Field
- U.S. National Register of Historic Places
- U.S. Historic district
- Location within Indiana Location within the United States
- Location: 426 W. Ludwig Rd., Fort Wayne, Indiana
- Coordinates: 41°08′36″N 085°09′10″W
- Area: 220 acres (89 ha)
- Built: 1919
- Architect: A.K. Hofer; Walter D'Arcy Ryan
- Architectural style: Aircraft Hangar
- NRHP reference No.: 02001495
- Added to NRHP: March 26, 2003

Smith Field (IATA: SMD, ICAO: KSMD, FAA LID: SMD) is a public airport north of downtown Fort Wayne, in Allen County, Indiana. It is owned and operated by the Fort Wayne Allen County Airport Authority. In the FAA's National Plan of Integrated Airport Systems for 2009–2013 it is a general aviation airport. The airport was listed on the National Register of Historic Places in 2002.

== History ==
Smith Field is Fort Wayne's first municipal airport and is one of America's oldest surviving aviation sites.

The United States government's pioneering of a national airmail system begun in 1918, provided essential subsidies for America's fledgling airline industry. On June 25, 1925, the city of Fort Wayne commissioned this airfield as the Paul Baer Municipal Airport. New paved runways, the huge heated Hangar #2 and other ongoing improvements to Baer Field finally attracted a commercial airmail carrier to Fort Wayne in December 1930. Transamerican, Capitol Airways, and Trans Continental and Western (TWA) followed with passenger service to Fort Wayne during the early 1930s. In 1932 nearly 3,000 passengers were served at old Paul Baer Municipal Airport.

Federal New Deal employment programs of the Great Depression further upgraded the airfield. In 1933, the Commerce Department's Aeronautics Branch and the Civil Works Administration (CWA) began a nationwide program of airport development. The CWA funded 13,108 man-hours of labor on Baer Field in 1933 alone, including drainage, lighting, sodding, tree removal, improved heating systems, improved parking areas, and the creation of flowerbeds. By 1934, the airport had improved the concrete runways and aprons, and in 1935 and 1936, the Works Progress Administration (WPA) funded more concrete pavement, lighting upgrades, and radio communication equipment. Old Baer Field was one of the largest WPA projects in Indiana. During this period, the airport enjoyed $311,058.42 in improvements paid for by the CWA, the Federal Emergency Relief Agency, the WPA, and the Allen County Scrip Organization.

Famous pilots who have visited Smith Field include: "Wrong Way" Douglas Corrigan, race pilot and military hero General Jimmy Doolittle, stunt flyer Jimmie Hayslip, Walter Hinton, Howard Hughes, airmail pilot George Hill, Charles Lindbergh, Captain Charles Nungesser, and fighter "Ace of Aces" Captain Eddie Rickenbacker. Captain Sir George Wilkins flew into the airport in the aircraft he had piloted to the North Pole. Famed pilot and explorer Wiley Post also visited the field in the Lockheed Vega "Winnie Mae", which he flew around the world. As every prominent aviator arrived, so did the community.

The federal government's anticipation of World War II and old Baer Field's role in the pioneer airmail service brought the U.S. War Department to Fort Wayne in 1940. Baer Field had been included in a list of some 1000 airfields that the Army Air Corps evaluated for new military flight operations. The new Development of Landing Areas for National Defense (DLAND) program eventually funded construction at 535 airports during World War II. Fearing the loss of civilian access to Baer Field, city leaders took options to buy 700 acres (2.8 km^{2}) south of the city should the War Department decide to operate a military airfield in Fort Wayne. Early in January 1941, the War Department informed the city that it would locate a base in Fort Wayne if it could take possession by February 1. Some thirty local businessmen signed notes totaling the $125,000 needed to arrange for the acquisition by the city.

The War Department signed a $1/year lease for the south side property and invited the community to suggest a name. The citizens of Fort Wayne supplied: "General Anthony Wayne Field", in honor of the Revolutionary War hero who was the builder of the first United States fort in Fort Wayne, and "Smith Field", celebrating Fort Wayne native Arthur "Art" Smith. Since Army Air Corps policy was to name airfields for deceased military aviators, a solution was found in naming the new Army airfield (south of town) after Paul Baer and renaming the existing municipal airport after Art Smith. The Army airfield (presently Fort Wayne International Airport) was officially designated the new "Baer Field" on June 14, 1941, and became a live Army base on December 6, 1941—the day before the attack on Pearl Harbor—with the arrival of 31 P-39 Airacobra fighter planes. Within days, as many as 100 of the planes were stationed there.

The old Baer Field, now renamed Smith Field, would remain Fort Wayne's civil airport through World War II, and has since served general aviation.

=== Modern history ===
In 2010, Runway 5/23 was rebuilt.

In 2024, a group called the National Airmail Museum announced it had signed a memorandum of understanding to lease Hangar 2.

== Facilities and aircraft ==
Smith Field covers 234 acres (95 ha) at an elevation of 835 feet (255 m) above mean sea level. It has two asphalt runways: 5/23 is 3,124 by 60 feet (952 x 18 m) and 13/31 is 2,922 by 100 feet (891 x 30 m).

In 2007 the airport had 20,109 aircraft operations, average 55 per day: 100% general aviation and <1% air taxi. 56 aircraft were then based at this airport: 96% single-engine and 4% multi-engine.

The airport offers aviation instruction and plane rental through Sweet Aviation, a subsidiary of Sweetwater Sound.

== See also ==
- List of airports in Indiana
