= Pi in the Sky =

Aerial art exhibition

External image
- The sky above the San Francisco Bay Area showing some of the numbers.

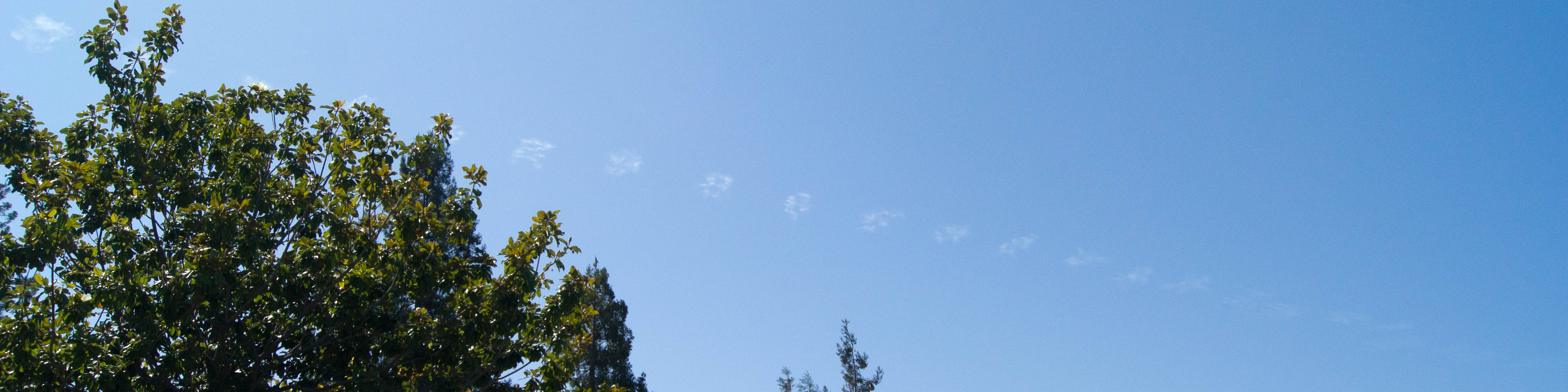
Numbers as they appeared several minutes after being written in the sky.

Pi in the Sky was an experimental aerial art display where airplanes spelled out pi to decimal 1,000 places in the sky over the San Francisco Bay Area. The display took place on September 12, 2012. It was then displayed again in Austin on March 13, 2014, during the SXSW festival, at which time it was said to be the largest art piece ever displayed in the state of Texas.

== Description ==
The numbers, each 0.4 kilometres (0.25 mi) high, were created by a group of five skywriting airplanes, and appeared as a dot matrix. The string of numbers was produced in a large loop 161 kilometres (100 mi) in circumference, at an altitude of approximately 10,000 feet (3,000 m).

The aircraft used were 1979 Grumman AA-5B Tigers, small, single-engined planes provided by the company AirSign Aerial Advertising, based in Williston, FL. The numbers were produced by spraying natural, burnt-off canola oil, which dissipated, causing no environmental damage.

The exhibition began in the skies over San Jose, then continued over Fremont, Hayward, Oakland, Berkeley, San Francisco, San Bruno, San Mateo, Redwood City, Palo Alto, and Mountain View. The planes deliberately flew over the headquarters of NASA Ames, Lawrence Livermore National Laboratory, University of California at Berkeley, Stanford University, Google, Facebook, Twitter, and Apple.

The 2012 display was part of the 2012 ZERO1 Biennial, was conceived by artist ISHKY, and involved a company called Stamen Design. ZERO1 is an art-technology network based in San Jose. The display was intended to draw attention to their biennial showcase for art and technology.

The 2014 display was part of an ongoing project, directed by artist ISHKY (Ben Davis), and again involved AirSign Aerial Advertising. The 2014 display quickly gained publicity making it the number 2 top trending hashtag on Twitter during the display and within 24 hours it was shared and viewed a little over six million times.
