= Ben Grossmann =

American visual effects supervisor

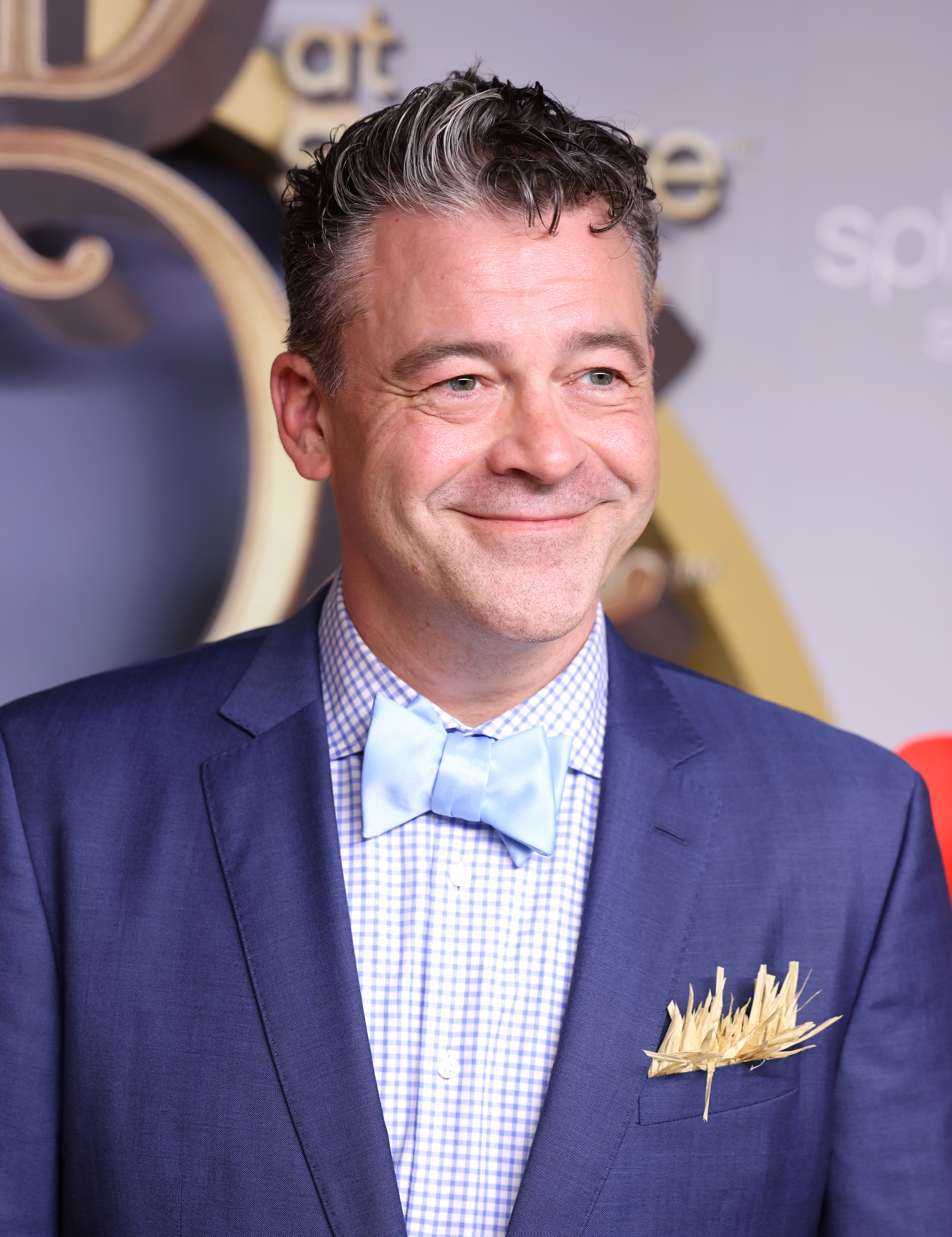
- Grossmann at the premiere of The Wizard of Oz at Sphere in Las Vegas, August 2025
- Born: Benjamin Tyndale Grossmann; July 23, 1977 (age 48); Washington, D.C., U.S.
- Occupations: CEO; Visual effects supervisor
- Years active: 2001–present
- Spouse: Ariane Rosier
- Children: Scarlet Rosier

Ben Grossmann (born June 23, 1977) is a visual effects supervisor and film producer based in Los Angeles. He won an Oscar for Hugo in 2012, and a Primetime Emmy Award for The Triangle in 2006. He is the co-founder and CEO of Magnopus, a cross-reality experience company.

== Career ==
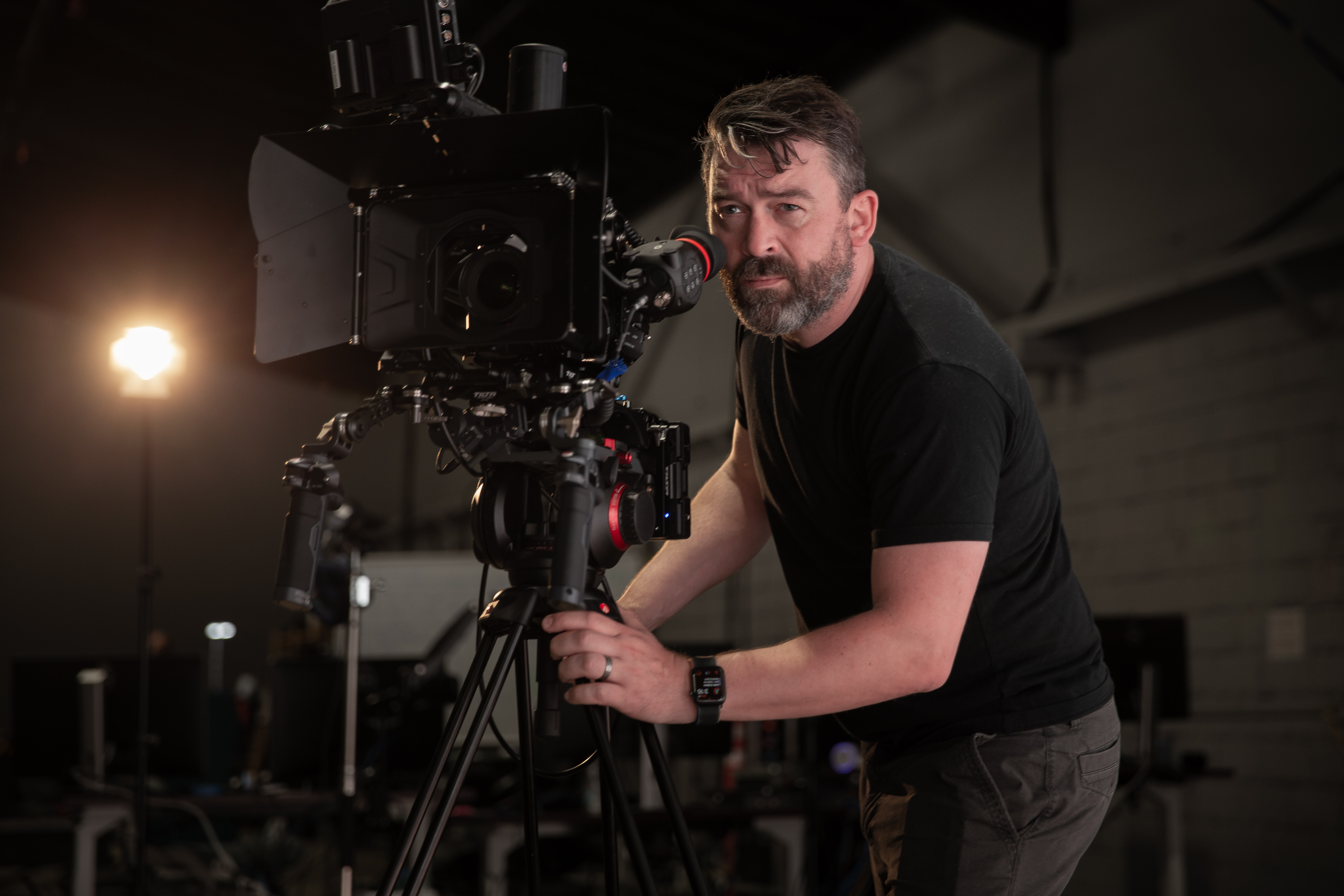
Grossmann filming in Los Angeles, May 2021

Between 1994 and 2000, he worked as a photojournalist at the Fairbanks Daily News-Miner in Fairbanks, Alaska. During the same time, he was a weatherman at both KFXF Fox 7 and KXDF-CD CBS13, and a radio DJ at KSUA 91.5FM in Fairbanks.

From 2001 to 2013, he worked as a visual effects artist and technician on major films, music videos, and commercials under visual effects supervisors including Rob Legato, Volker Engel, and Marc Weigert for Martin Scorsese, Roland Emmerich, J.J. Abrams, Tim Burton, Jon Favreau, and other filmmakers. During that era, Grossmann worked on music videos for Radiohead, Justin Timberlake, Mariah Carey, etc. and directed television commercials. He worked as a designer on Harry Potter and the Forbidden Journey a motion-based dark ride in The Wizarding World of Harry Potter.

In 2013, he and partners Alex Henning and Rodrigo Teixeira formed Magnopus, a visual development company with offices in downtown Los Angeles and St Albans, England. Between 2018 and 2022, he was director for the largest cross-reality geospatial metaverse to date at Expo 2020 in Dubai, UAE. He served as a narrative and exhibition designer for the Mobility Pavilion there. He is a patented inventor in mixed reality.

In 2022, his company's Connected Spaces platform was selected as one of Time's Best Inventions of 2022. In 2025, Grossman served as a producer and visual effects specialist for an "immersive" version of the 1939 film The Wizard of Oz for Sphere in Las Vegas.

== Early life ==
Benjamin Tyndale Grossmann was born on June 23, 1977, at Walter Reed Army Medical Center in Washington, D.C. His father Bruce R. Grossmann, served in the U.S. Army first as an enlisted medic and then as a signal officer. His mother, Dawn Elise Frazier(née Warren and then Grossmann) was a preschool teacher and weather observer in Delta Junction, Alaska southeast of Fairbanks. He has two sisters Brooke and Annalise, and a brother, Elias. Although he traveled extensively throughout the United States as a child, Ben Grossmann spent most of his childhood in Alaska before moving to California.

== Awards ==
In 2013, he was nominated for an Oscar for the film Star Trek Into Darkness, which was directed by J.J. Abrams. In 2012, Grossmann won an Academy Award for Best Visual Effects for the film Hugo, directed by Martin Scorsese. (Video)

In 2006, Grossmann won a Primetime Emmy Award for Outstanding Special Visual Effects for a Miniseries, Movie or a Special for The Triangle. In 2011, he won a Satellite Award for Best Visual Effects. He has won two Visual Effects Society Awards: Outstanding Virtual Cinematography for The Lion King in 2020, and Outstanding Supporting Visual Effects in a Feature Motion Picture for Hugo. He has been nominated twice (in 2011 and 2013) for the BAFTA Award for Best Special Visual Effects.
