= Art Smith (pilot) =

Arthur Roy Smith
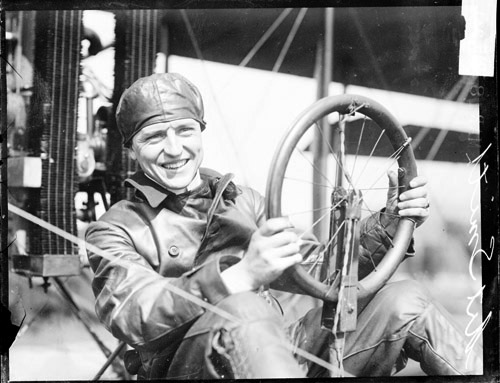
- Born: February 27, 1890; Fort Wayne, Indiana, USA
- Died: February 12, 1926 (aged 35); Montpelier, Ohio
- Cause of death: Aircrash
- Burial place: Lindenwood Cemetery, Fort Wayne, Indiana, USA
- Spouse: Aimee Cour
- Parent(s): James F. Smith; Ida Krick

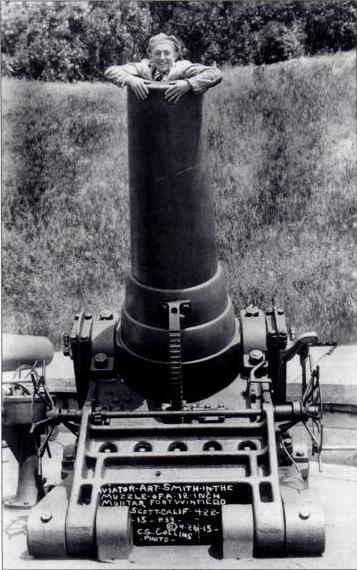
Art Smith posing in the muzzle of a 12-inch mortar at the Presidio of San Francisco during the 1915 Panama–Pacific International Exposition

Arthur Roy Smith (February 27, 1890 – February 12, 1926) was an American pilot. After Charles Ames, he was the second overnight mail service pilot to die on duty.

== Early life and career ==
Smith was born on February 27, 1890, in Fort Wayne, Indiana, to James F. Smith and Ida Krick.

In 1910, his parents mortgaged their home for $1,800 so that he could build a plane, on which he spent six months. He crashed it on his first flight, destroying everything but the motor.

He quickly became a celebrated stunt pilot, notable for flying at night; he was one of the pioneers of skywriting at night using flares attached to his aircraft. Katherine Stinson, one of America's first female stunt pilots, was inspired to compete against him by this feat, and the competition between her, Smith, and other men received widespread press coverage.

On March 14, 1915, fellow aviator Lincoln Beachey, who was the official stunt flyer at the Panama–Pacific International Exposition in San Francisco, died after crashing into the bay. Art Smith, who was racing his "Baby Cars" at the fair, was hired to take Beachey's place and flew his airplane for spectators for the duration of the exposition.

Smith made two trips to Asia, in 1916 and 1917. His aerobatics demonstrations in Korea during those trips are believed to have inspired both An Chang-nam (Korea's first male pilot) and Kwon Ki-ok (Korea's first female pilot) to learn to fly.

== During World War I ==
Smith later worked as a test pilot and instructor after the American entry into World War I. He had originally sought to enroll in the United States Army's Air Service, but was refused. His height (5 feet 3 inches) was mentioned as one possible reason for the refusal; the numerous injuries he had suffered in earlier crashes were another. During the war, he was stationed at Langley Field, Virginia, and McCook Field, Ohio. He was one of two men trained to fly the De Bothezat helicopter, an early quadrotor helicopter.

== Airmail Service ==
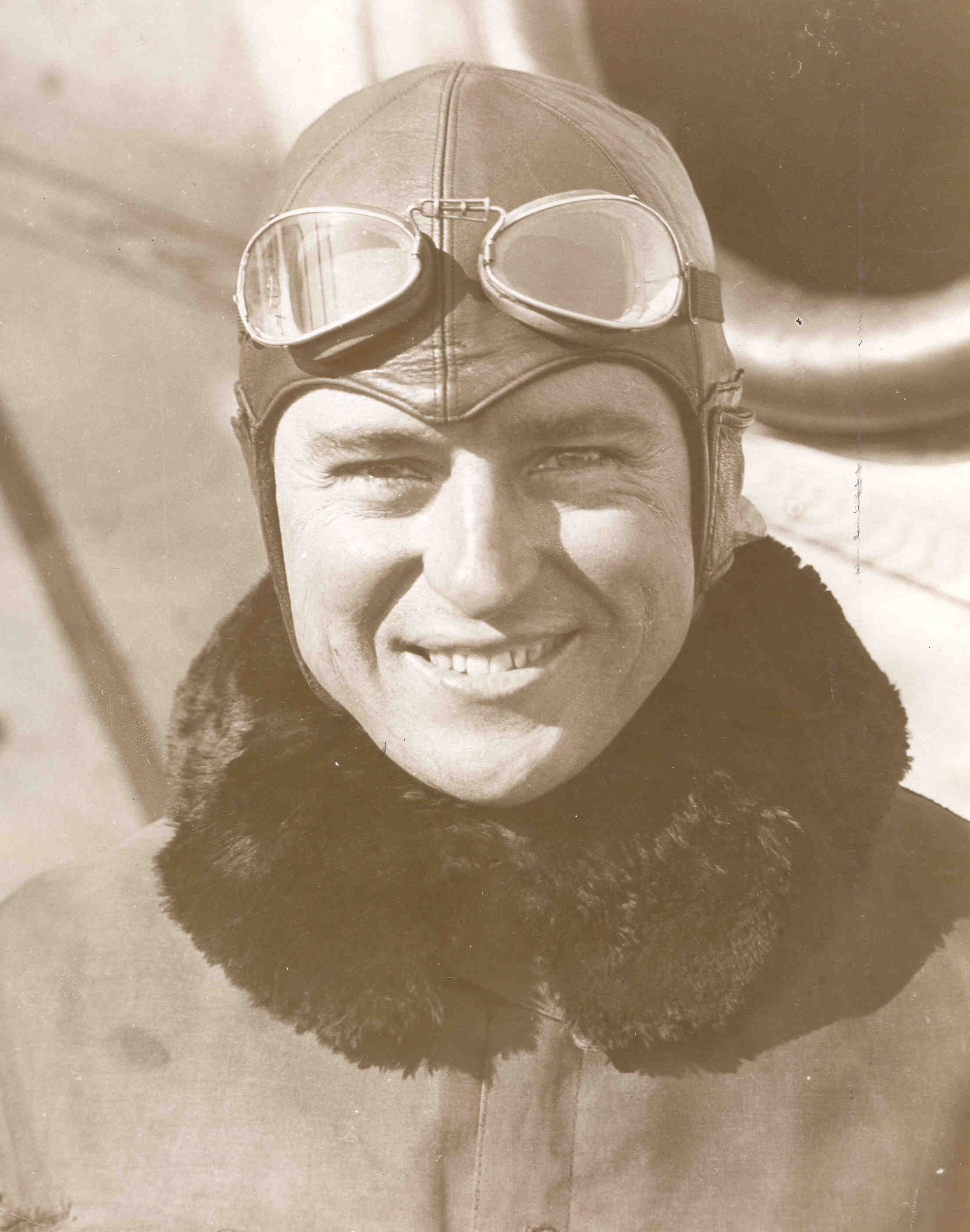
Airmail pilot Arthur Roy Smith in 1924

After the war, he joined the United States Post Office. He eventually came to fly the overnight airmail delivery route between New York City and Chicago, established in July 1925.

He died February 12, 1926, near Montpelier, Ohio. He was two miles off-course when he crashed a Curtiss Carrier Pigeon into a grove of trees while flying east. He is buried in Lindenwood Cemetery in Fort Wayne, Indiana.

== Legacy ==
Fort Wayne's Smith Field is named after him.

Smith unknowingly contributed to the foundation of Honda when during Smith's tour of Asia in 1917, a young Japanese bicycle mechanic named Soichiro Honda rode twenty miles from his home hoping to see Smith demonstrate his aerial capabilities, along with seeing an airplane in flight for the very first time. Although he could not afford the admission fee, seeing Smith in flight from a tree was a moment that left a deep impression on him and cemented his interest in mechanical objects, with Soichiro's interest in mechanics and motorized vehicles leading to the creation of the Honda company bearing his name.

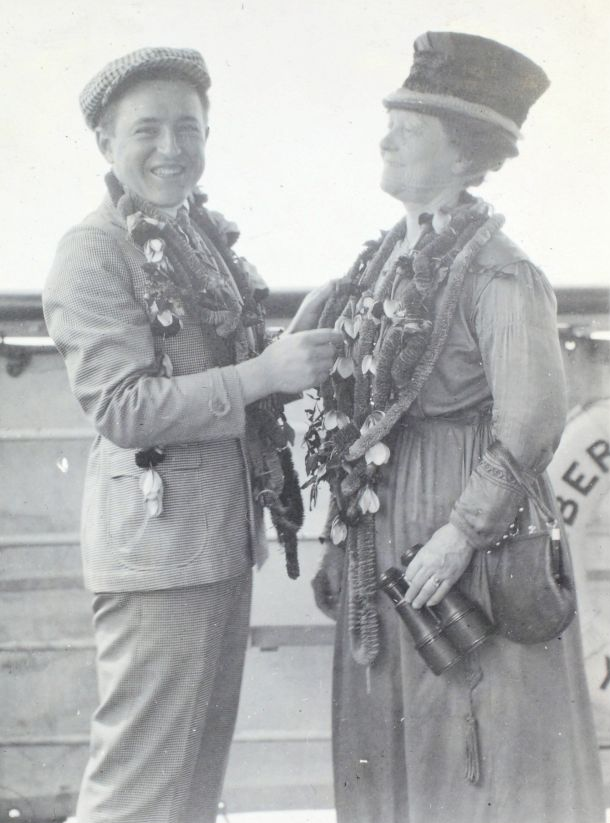
Art Smith with his mother in Honolulu, Hawaii, aboard the Siberia Maru
