= Skytypers Air Show Team =

American aerobatic team

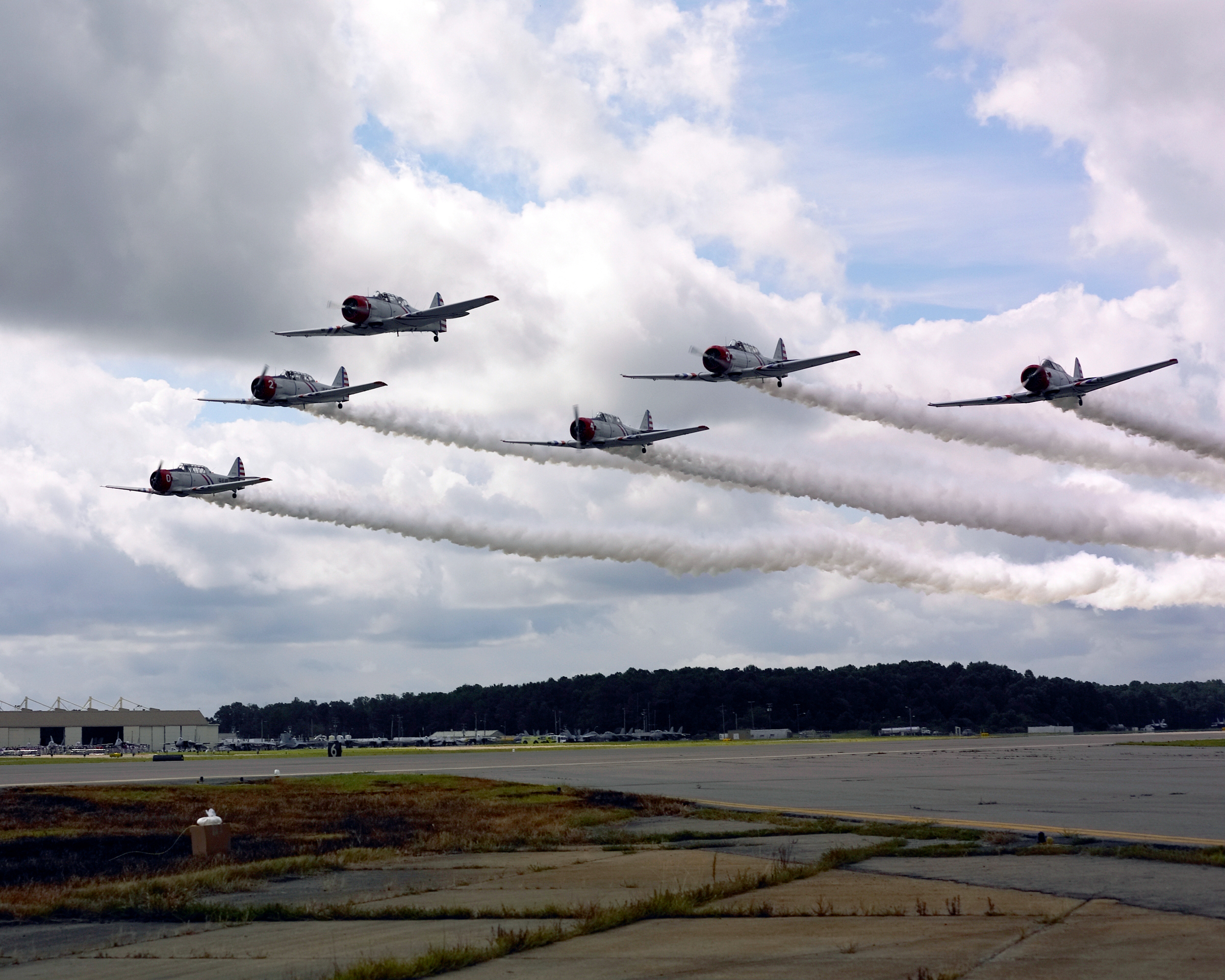
The Skytypers performing in 2004

The GEICO Skytypers Air Show Team was an aerobatic team that performed at airshows around the United States using six SNJ-2 World War II-era planes. The team was most recently sponsored by GEICO. The smoke system was originally controlled by a manually wired rig, then by paper punch card messages, and eventually able to handle 50,000 messages that could be reprogrammed in flight.

== 2007 accident ==
On September 7, 2007, opposing solo - #6, Jan Wildbergh was killed while returning to the runway following a successful rehearsal for the annual Naval Air Station Oceana Air Show in Virginia Beach, Virginia. Wildbergh was the last in line to land but did not complete the break in formation after the last maneuver, a flyover at show center. Instead, the aircraft continued straight ahead losing altitude until it hit the ground. According to the team spokesman, Wildbergh was too low to use his parachute and did not have an ejection seat. The airshow went on without the GEICO Skytypers the next day. The Blue Angels flew a missing man formation in that show to honor Wildbergh.

== Armenian genocide incident ==
On 20 April 2016, the company GEICO Skytypers was paid for producing skywriting over New York City stating "101 years of Geno-lie," "Gr8 ally = Turkey," "BFF = Russia + Armenia," and "FactCheckArmenia.com." The company later apologized for conveying Armenian genocide denial messages.

== 2018 accident ==
On May 30, 2018, a GEICO Skytyper plane crashed in Melville, New York, killing the pilot identified as Ken Johansen. Johansen served as Executive Officer of the team and was a graduate of the U.S. Naval Academy, a Naval aviator, and a professional airline pilot. The team had finished the annual Bethpage Airshow at Jones Beach 4 days earlier. No one on the ground was injured during the crash.

== 2021 accident ==
On August 20, 2021, a GEICO Skytyper plane crashed at the Scranton/Wilkes-Barre airport, killing the pilot Andy Travnicek. Travnicek was a graduate of the U.S. Air Force Academy, served in the U.S. Armed Forces, and was also a commercial airline pilot.
