= Gingham dress of Judy Garland =

Dress worn in The Wizard of Oz

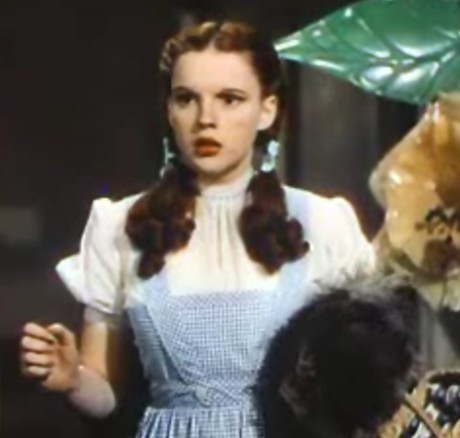
- Judy Garland wearing the dress in a trailer for The Wizard of Oz
- Designer: Adrian
- Year: 1939
- Type: Gingham pinafore

In the 1939 film The Wizard of Oz, American entertainer Judy Garland wore a blue-and-white dress for her seminal role as Dorothy Gale throughout the film. Also nicknamed the "Dorothy dress", it was designed for the film by MGM costume designer Adrian, who based it on L. Frank Baum's description of Dorothy's dress in his children's book The Wonderful Wizard of Oz (1900). Several copies of the dress were made for Garland to wear during production, which were styled to make her appear younger and thinner on camera. The complete outfit consists of a checked blue-and-white gingham pinafore worn over a cream-colored blouse. It is often paired with ruby slippers, another famous clothing item from the film.

The dress was sewn on a treadle sewing machine to help it appear authentically homemade. Considerably modest in comparison to most of the film's costumes, the garment's simple, youthful design is meant to represent Dorothy's innocence, while its bright color symbolizes the character's journey from mundane Kansas to the vibrant Land of Oz, which were filmed in sepia tone and Technicolor, respectively. The "Dorothy dress" is often credited with helping popularize the use of gingham fabric in women's fashion during the 20th century, following the film's release in 1939.

Eventually becoming synonymous with Garland's public image, the character of Dorothy, and The Wizard of Oz, the dress is one of the most famous costumes in cinematic history. In the decades since the film's release, various original copies of the dress have been acquired, owned, and sold by different individuals. Several auction houses have sold the dress for upwards of a million dollars, making it one of the most valuable costumes in film history. The second of only two complete surviving dresses has been the subject of a lawsuit over ownership since 2022, renewing public interest in the garment.

== History ==
In L. Frank Baum's 1900 children's novel The Wonderful Wizard of Oz, main character Dorothy Gale selects a checked blue-and-white gingham dress from her closet to wear to the Emerald City. American actress and singer Judy Garland wore a blue-and-white dress to play the character in MGM's 1939 film adaptation of the book, which was the only costume she wore for the entire film. The dress was designed by costume designer Adrian, who designed several other costumes for the film, including Dorothy's famed pair of ruby slippers. As MGM's main costumier at the time, Dorothy's simple frock was a significant deviation from the glamorous gowns Adrian had previously designed for some of the era's most prolific actresses. He made 8–10 different prototypes of the dress before settling on its final checked design, which resembled the outfit Baum described in his novel. (Note: In the book The Making of The Wizard of Oz (2013), film historian Aljean Harmetz reported that in circumstances when scenes and costumes were not explicitly depicted by W. W. Denslow's illustrations, they based their designs on Baum's text, which described Dorothy's dress as "gingham, with checks of blue and white".) Early concepts of the dress included a red version and an entirely blue version with polka dot trim, as well as a matching blouse adorned with blue bows on its sleeves and collar. Garland wore the dress with a blond wig and heavy makeup. The solid-blue dress does not appear in the final film and was only used during the first two weeks of filming in 1938 under director Richard Thorpe, who was briefly replaced by George Cukor upon leaving the project. Cukor re-styled Garland's dress and her natural hair into pigtails to better resemble a young girl from Kansas, which ultimately became her final appearance under director Victor Fleming. (Note: Due to conflicting visions and commitments, The Wizard of Oz was directed by several different directors at various times throughout production, including Norman Taurog, Richard Thorpe, George Cukor, Victor Fleming, and King Vidor. Although Fleming directed most of the film and is officially credited, Vidor replaced him to complete the film after Fleming left to direct Gone With the Wind.)

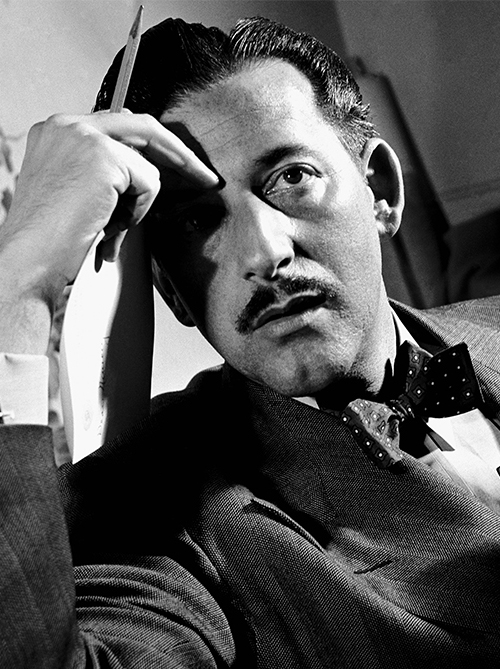
Costume designer Adrian designed costumes for The Wizard of Oz, including Dorothy's gingham dress.

Filmmakers opted for the checked dress in an effort to make the then 16-year-old Garland appear closer in age to her 12-year-old orphan character. (Note: Sources are conflicted over whether Garland was 16 or 17 while filming The Wizard of Oz.) Producers also felt the pattern blurred Garland's figure, which made her appear slimmer on camera, and styled and cut the dress to help her appear younger. Garland also wore a tight-fitting corset to suppress her breasts, which were further bound by a sewn-in panel. Several identical versions of the final dress were made for Garland to wear during filming, with some researchers believing at least 10 were created. The Wizard of Oz Museum has verified seven. At the time, it was common for film studios to create multiple copies of a single costume or prop to avoid having to halt production should an item be lost or damaged. At the time of the film's release, the media speculated that Garland had worn through all dresses during production, although film historian John Fricke contends that this number was exaggerated, and she likely wore closer to 4–6. According to The Guardian and British Vogue, Garland is thought to have worn only two of the dresses on screen. Each dress was made from cheap gingham and sewn roughly using a treadle sewing machine to appear as though it had been homemade by Dorothy's Aunt Em. Adrian had sourced the gingham material during a trip to Appalachia. According to HuffPost senior editor Caroline Bologna, the fabric was considered a natural choice for Dorothy, a Kansas native, since the pattern was most popular throughout the Great Plains during the early 20th century. The blouse Garland wore underneath was delicate and often prone to tearing when Garland removed it after filming. The film's seamstresses complained about having to repair it almost daily in time for the next shoot.

Since the beginning of the film was shot in black-and-white and sepia tone to emphasize the drab, uninteresting nature of Dorothy's Kansas farm home, audiences do not see the dress's true color until Dorothy is magically transported to Oz, which was filmed in Technicolor. A grey version of the dress (the only one of its kind) was created specifically for the moment the film transitions from sepia to color, but was never worn by Garland herself. Instead, Garland's body double, Bobbie Koshay, was filmed from behind wearing the grey dress while opening the farmhouse door, revealing the colorful Munchkinland through the doorframe. The farmhouse interior was also re-painted sepia for the scene to match Koshay's dress. Koshay slowly backs out of frame to be replaced by Garland wearing the bright blue dress as she ventures into Munchkinland for the first time. Despite being widely perceived as blue and white, the dress was actually blue and light pink, which was considered easier to capture in Technicolor, a new medium at the time.

Garland found the shoot difficult for several reasons, one of which was some of the actors playing Munchkins allegedly groped her repeatedly underneath her dress. After completing The Wizard of Oz, MGM re-used most of Dorothy's dresses in subsequent films.

== Design and analysis ==
The dress consists of a fitted bodice, to which straps are affixed to its front and back by two mother-of-pearl buttons. According to an auction listing, the buttons give the garment the illusion of buttoning at both the wearer's front and back waist. Made from cotton gingham, the skirt was equipped with a deep hidden pocket on its right-side seam. The pinafore is usually worn over a high-necked cream-colored organdy blouse with puffed short sleeves, embellished with blue ribbons, and often incongruously paired with ruby slippers. Both the pinafore and blouse are fastened at the back using a hook-and-eye closure. Dorothy wears black saddle shoes before her footwear is replaced with ruby slippers.

The complete ensemble is understated compared to the outfits other characters wear in Oz, which alludes to Dorothy's shy, innocent nature, and humble farm upbringing. In her book The Hundred Dresses (2013), lexicographer Erin McKean defined the "Dorothy dress" as any dress a main female character wears upon finding herself embarking on an unexpected adventure, usually for their first time. According to journalist and fashion editor Jess Cartner-Morley, Dorothy's dress and wholesome image embody the film's "no place like home" message. CNN writer Hilary Whiteman believes the mundaneness of Dorothy's costume was a deliberate choice made by MGM to emphasize the difference between the girl from Kansas and the fantastical world based on Baum's imagination. Similarly, Profiles in History founder Joseph Maddalena said in The Hollywood Reporter that the dress establishes Dorothy has traveled from "boring" Kansas to Oz.

According to various critics, the color blue is symbolic in the context of Dorothy's dress. In the original book, the Munchkins assume Dorothy is a friendly witch because, according to them, only witches and sorcerers wear white, while Munchkins themselves wear blue. The Colour of Fashion (2022) author Caroline Young stated that female characters such as Dorothy are dressed in blue, a traditionally masculine color, to symbolize the act stepping outside of their comfort zones in pursuit of freedom or adventure. Courtney Gisriel of Today and Calin Van Paris of Allure also observed that Dorothy and other female characters wear blue to indicate that they will soon be embarking on a new, unfamiliar adventure.

== Reception and impact ==
According to David J. Hogan, author of The Wizard of Oz FAQ: All That's Left to Know About Life According to Oz (2014), the dress proved that Adrian was equally comfortable designing extravagant gowns as he was "a believable Kansas outfit", a sentiment shared by Jessica Pickens of DVD Netflix. Praising Adrian's work, Booth Moore of Women's Wear Daily described two versions of the pinafore as "so beautifully stitched ... it’s easy to understand how the MGM costume giant also had a successful fashion label". The Victoria and Albert Museum considers it to be one of the finest costumes designed for one of cinema's most famous characters. However, Christopher Laverty, author of Fashion in Film (2021), found the dress poorly-made with uneven stitching. Although Laverty acknowledged that the poor craftsmanship might have been intentional to match the character's farm girl image, the author believes Adrian's typical attention to detail more likely suffered from the film's tumultuous production.

Ultimately, the dress achieved international fame. Adrian's work on the "Dorothy dress" is credited with helping make gingham fashionable womenswear in the United States, prior to which the textile had often been used to make household furniture and children's clothing. During the early 20th century, gingham was already common among rural residents of the Great Plains, who appreciated its durability; the trend only became more popular once audiences saw it worn by Kansas native Dorothy for the first time. After the film was released in 1939, the dress was immediately embraced by mothers and daughters who wanted to emulate the style themselves. Its design was replicated and sold by several department stores, with sewing patterns being inserted into fashion magazines from the time period. Several toy companies created "Judy Garland" dolls beginning as early as 1939, many of which were dressed in her costume from The Wizard of Oz. The first composition Judy Garland doll debuted in Christmas 1939, with a blue gingham jumper and white organdy blouse designed by Mary Bauer that is a near-perfect replica of the original costume, with minor variations in the appearance of its collar and sleeves. Adrian later designed a gingham dress for actress Katharine Hepburn to wear in the film The Philadelphia Story (1941), which further established the pattern as a trend, and became a trademark of his work throughout his career.

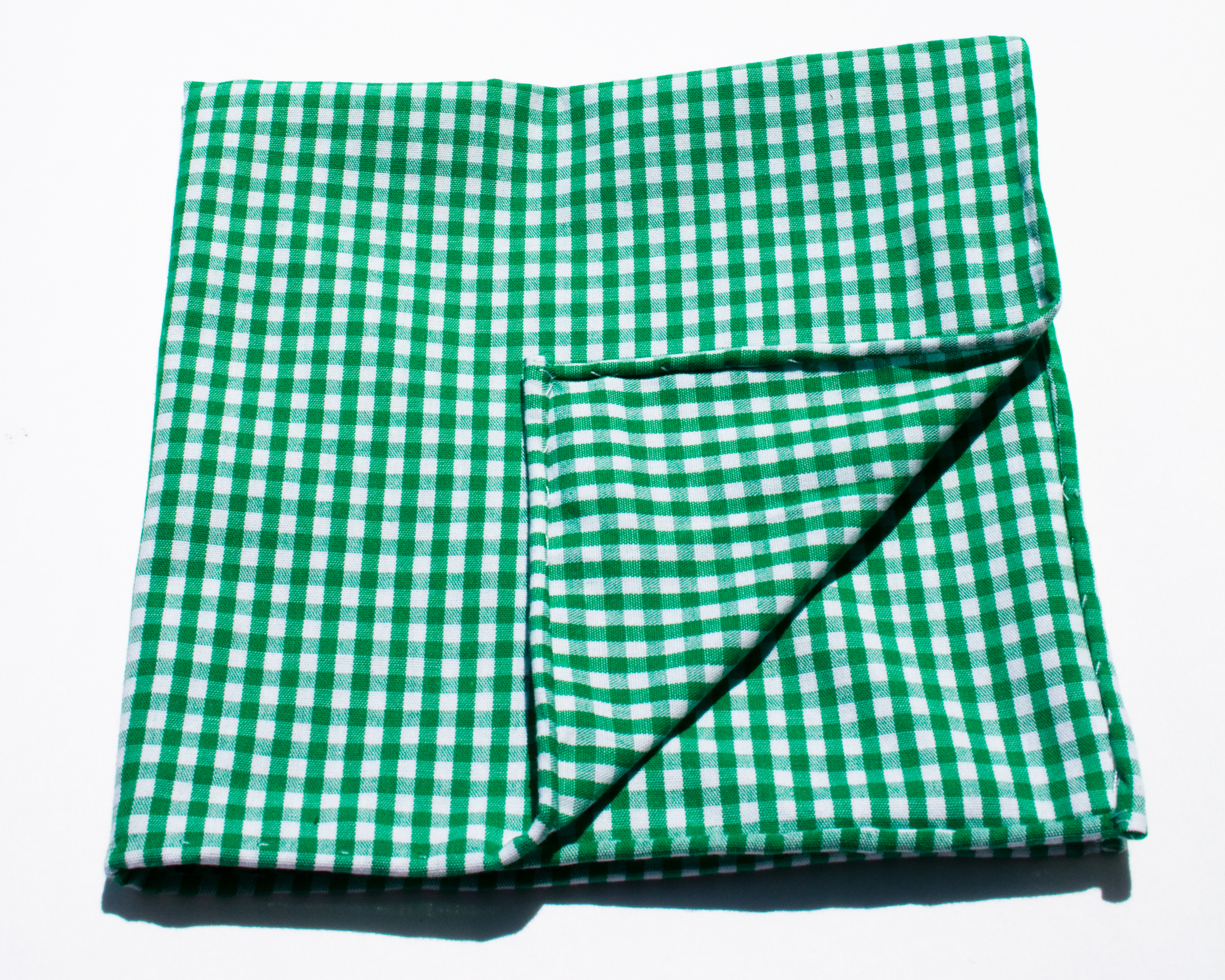
The popularity of the "Dorothy dress" is credited with making gingham a fashionable pattern.

Despite its common association with picnic tablecloths, the fabric and pattern remain most closely affiliated with Dorothy's dress, with University of Fashion contributor Antonia Sardone calling Adrian responsible for gingham's popularity. According to MasterClass and The Mood Guide to Fabric and Fashion: The Essential Guide from the World's Most Famous Fabric Store (2015), the fabric immortalized itself in popular culture as result of the "Dorothy dress". According to Matthew Velasco of L'Officiel USA, the dress "fully cement[ed] the textile's place in the lexicon of fashion". Vogue France named it one of the six most iconic gingham outfits in film history, while Rosalind Jana from the same publication called it "immediately identifiable". Leah Melby Clinton, a writer for Elle, said the pattern has become synonymous with sweetness due to its association with Dorothy and Garland. Tara Lamont-Djite of Harper's Bazaar said "Nothing is more memorable than Dorothy in her checked pinafore". The Luminaries Magazine editor Alison Jane Reid hailed it as "a fashion masterpiece designed to evoke the idea of the wholesome, plucky, apple pie American girl". In the book A List: The National Society Of Film Critics' 100 Essential Films Paperback, film critic Peter Keough reviewed that the theater audience for a remastered version of The Wizard of Oz consisted of mostly hundreds of prepubescent girls dressed in Dorothy's blue gingham dress.

The dress continues to influence fashion trends in the 21st century. Writing for Glamour, Alexandra Fullerton believes the dress "proves that while gingham is the pattern of summer 2021, it's also been totally on-trend since 1939". To commemorate the film's 75th anniversary in 2014, several fashion designers worked with Tonner Doll Collection to create high-fashion dolls inspired by its main female characters. Fashion designers Chris Benz and Trina Turk modernized Dorothy's style using blue and white gingham. The "Dorothy dress" and aesthetic experienced a comeback in 2019 due to a revived appreciation for prairie and Victorian dresses, which CNN's Hilary Whiteman described as "a natural reaction to previous trends to bare all". Emma Firth of Elle named Dorothy their style icon of 2019. Joy Montgomery of British Vogue noted another resurgence in summer 2025, writing, "the merry old land of fashion is clearly still feeling the Dorothy effect, as gingham has usurped classic florals as the key dress print of this summer".

In the film Oz the Great and Powerful (2013), a spiritual prequel to The Wizard of Oz, the character Annie (Michelle Williams) wears a gingham dress referencing Dorothy. Annie says she is engaged to John Gale, implying that she is either the mother or close relative of Dorothy. In Wicked: For Good (2025), a film adaptation of the second act of the Broadway musical Wicked, the character Dorothy's (Bethany Weaver) face is never shown, and she appears in profile and silhouette only. Costume designer Paul Tazewell incorporated the silhouette of a turn-of-the-century girl’s dress in blue gingham as an homage to Garland’s costume from the 1939 film, without recreating it directly, which he was neither permitted nor interested in doing. Tazewell also made sure the costume was reminiscent of what Dorothy wears in Baum's novel.

== Legacy ==
=== Cultural significance ===
Although Garland and the film are best-remembered for the ruby slippers, the "Dorothy dress" remains one of the most recognizable components of The Wizard of Oz, with Andrew Wright of Everything Zoomer calling it "instantly recognizable". Aaron Katersky of Good Morning America described it as "recognized worldwide as an iconic image of perhaps the most beloved and watched film in the history of cinema", while Luiza Sauma of The Guardian believes few images in American cinema are as recognizable as Dorothy wearing her blue gingham dress in The Wizard of Oz. Echoing Sauma's sentiments that "Few costumes in movie history are as iconic", Christian Zilko of Indiewire said "the initial reveal of Garland’s Dorothy stepping out into the colorful Land of Oz is instantly recognizable both for its narrative significance and the technological breakthrough that [the dress] signified". Ranking it among the 10 most iconic movie dresses, Alexandra Locke of Comic Book Resources said the film's title alone evokes images of Dorothy wearing the dress while "trying to find her way home". The dress is widely considered to be one of the most famous outfits in cinematic history. Tai Gooden of Nerdist called it arguably "one of the most recognizable [movie] items of all time", while Matthew Jackson of Syfy dubbed it "One of the most famous movie costumes of all time". Profiles in History founder Joseph Maddalena said the dress is among "the most culturally significant items in film history".

Several media publications have ranked the outfit among the most beloved dresses to have appeared on film, including Cosmopolitan, Glamour, The Guardian, Harper's Bazaar, MSN, Redbook, Vogue Arabia, and British Vogue, the latter of whom said both the dress and slippers deserve "spots in the Hollywood fashion history hall of fame". Although Adrian designed for numerous Hollywood actresses, and experienced a successful career both before and after The Wizard of Oz, he remains best-remembered for designing Dorothy's dress and shoes. According to Fashion in Film (2021) author Christopher Laverty, his achievements are often reduced to the single ensemble, despite having designed over 3000 costumes for the film. Meanwhile, Amy M. Nebens, author of Screen Gems with Hems, called it his most famous costume. The dress also remains a popular Halloween costume several decades after the film's release, and is often recreated or referenced in subsequent adaptations of the story across various media. Singer Harry Styles wore the costume during a pair of Halloween-themed concerts at Madison Square Garden in 2021.

=== Ownership and auctions ===
According to Sarah Cascone of Artnet, five of the dresses have survived, only two of which retained their original blouses. Since filming wrapped on The Wizard of Oz in 1939, the costumes have been rotated among various owners. Different versions have been sold or auctioned by various individuals, including actress Debbie Reynolds. The surviving dresses are considered to be among the world's most valuable film memorabilia. Reynolds' version of the 'test dress" was sold for $910,000 ($1,119,000 after taxes) in 2011, far exceeding estimates. During the 1970s, costume designer Kent Warner was hired to help MGM catalog and auction some of their most famous props and costumes. He reportedly kept some of the studio's most prized memorabilia for himself, including a "Dorothy dress" he eventually sold at Christie's in 1981. In 2012, Warner's copy of the dress (one of the only two surviving versions to have retained its blouse) was sold at Julien's Auctions for $490,000. In 2015, the same dress was re-sold for $1.5 million, the most earned by any of Dorothy's dresses at the time. However, the film's "Cowardly Lion" costume had sold for $2.6 million the previous year, making the latter the most valuable Wizard of Oz costume. Meanwhile, Koshay's sepia dress was auctioned for $750,000 in 2019.

In 2021, one of the four remaining dresses known to exist was rediscovered at the Catholic University of America, after having been presumed lost for four decades. The dress was originally gifted to drama department founder Gilbert V. Hartke by actress Mercedes McCambridge in 1973, two years before he retired. A companion of Garland's, McCambridge donated the costume to the school, where she had been working as an artist-in-residence, to thank Hartke for helping her overcome her substance abuse, hoping the gesture would inspire students. It is unclear how McCambridge came to own the piece, but some researches believe she acquired it from the MGM auction. In 1973, a writer for the campus newspaper The Tower remarked that acquiring the dress metaphorically addressed Garland's regrets over having never attended college. The dress was misplaced during the 1980s after Hartke's death, and its existence was deemed an urban legend among staff and students.

In summer 2021, lecturer Matt Ripa unsuspectingly found the dress in a shoebox while he had been preparing the drama department for renovations. The university contacted the Smithsonian National Museum of American History, who authenticated the garment by comparing its unique characteristics to those of other verified Dorothy dresses, namely a hidden pocket, "Judy Garland" hand-written on a label, and repaired tears. Despite yellowing from age and a torn blouse, the costume was considered to be in good condition overall. Museum curators determined that the dress was one of only six possessing enough evidence to be legitimate. It is believed to have been worn by Garland during the scene when Dorothy is imprisoned and threatened by the Wicked Witch of the West (Margaret Hamilton) in her fortress, specifically the moment the Witch uses an hourglass to determine how much time is left until she kills Dorothy. The university stored the costume in its "Special Collections" unit, a temperature and humidity-controlled environment, as they deemed the item too valuable to display.

The costume was exhibited at Bonhams New York in April 2022. In May 2022, the auction house relocated the dress to be sold in Los Angeles, with the school originally planning to use its proceeds towards their drama department. It was projected to earn between $800,000 and $1.2 million. However, United States District Judge Paul Gardephe granted a preliminary injunction preventing the sale when Barbara Ann Hartke, a niece of Hartke, filed a lawsuit claiming to be the dress's rightful owner as heir to Gilbert's estate, and contending that the costume had been personally gifted to her uncle as opposed to the school. Meanwhile, the university's lawyers submitted evidence contesting that Hartke would have approved the auction to support the department he founded, including statements from two of his relatives. The university also argued that, as a priest and member of the Dominican Order, Hartke had taken a vow of poverty preventing him from accepting personal gifts. Gardephe's ruling prohibited the sale or transfer of the item until a verdict had been reached in federal court. In addition to generating renewed interest in the dress, the media coverage surrounding the lawsuit furthered ongoing discussions about the ownership and conservation of historical garments. (Note: In May 2022, media personality Kim Kardashian had been publicly condemned for wearing a dress originally worn by actress Marilyn Monroe to the 2022 Met Gala, and allegedly damaging the garment. The controversy contributed to media discourse surrounding the use and preservation of historical garments.) In December 2023, over a year after the auction was postponed, Gardephe dismissed the lawsuit, ruling that Barbara Hartke "had failed to establish that she had legal standing to assert an ownership right" over the dress. The Wizard of Oz Museum obtained a 7th version of the dress from a private collector in 2022.

== See also ==
- List of individual dresses
