= Francesca Sterlacci =

American fashion designer, author and entrepreneur

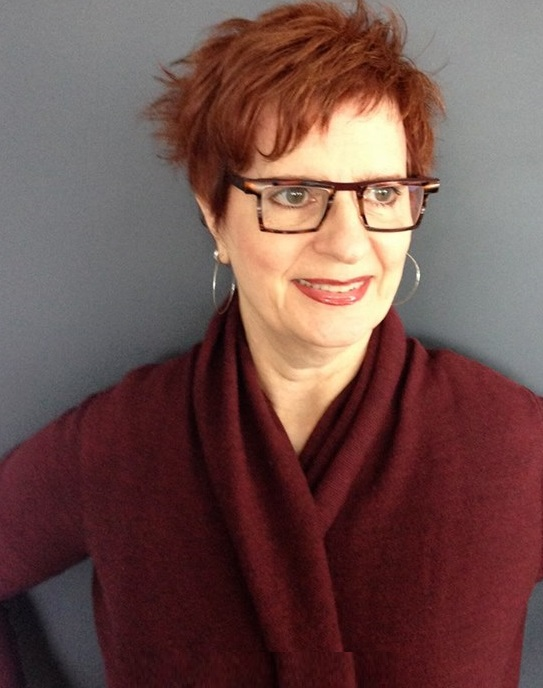
- Born: 1951 (age 74–75); Hoboken, New Jersey
- Education: Fashion Institute of Technology
- Occupation: Fashion designer
- Website: francescasterlacci.com

Francesca Sterlacci is an American fashion designer, author and entrepreneur. She launched her clothing brand, Francesca Sterlacci Ltd. in 1980, and continued designing clothes under her label until 1989. Sterlacci joined the Fashion Institute of Technology as a teacher in 1990, and became the chairwoman of the Fashion department at the institute in 2001.

In 2013, Sterlacci launched University of Fashion, an online library of fashion design videos.

== Early life and education ==
Sterlacci was born in Hoboken, and raised in Union City. When she was ten, she used scraps from her mother's sewing machine and prepared Barbie doll costumes. Her mother did not allow her to use the sewing machine herself, so she had to hand stitch dresses, and that helped her improve her hand stitching skills. She kept some of these dresses and sold others to neighborhood friends.

While studying at the Emerson High School in Union City, she collaborated with a friend on making mini and maxi skirts and selling them to boutiques in New York. After completing high school, she joined Fashion Institute of Technology and received Associate of Applied Science degree in fashion design. Upon graduating, she joined Jersey City State College for a bachelor's degree in art.

== Career ==
Sterlacci started her career in the late 70s working for a body suit company. She later joined a junior sportswear firm, Sunday's Workclothes, who sent her to a lot to countries like India, Hong Kong, Italy, France and Taiwan. She became a head merchandiser at Time and Place where she managed five divisions. Sterlacci developed a label of her own in her spare time.

She founded Francesca Sterlacci Ltd. in 1980 and the first collection consisted of 15 sportswear pieces. Her designs were greatly influenced by her travel while at Sunday's Workclothes. By 1981, she added leather to her collection. The top-selling clothes in her line were in leather and suede.

In 1981, after positive feedback on her designs, she quit her day job and started working on her label full-time. Sterlacci started her business using savings and a few loans and did not have financial backers or factors. In 1983, she added a selection of knit and weave sportswear to the line. She opened her own showroom, and kept producing clothes under her label until 1989. In 1990, Sterlacci opened a freelance design service called Design Instinct, designing clothes for other designers.

In 1990, she started teaching at Fashion Institute of Technology and in 2001, she became the Chair of FIT's Fashion Design Department. She held that position until 2004, when she moved to San Francisco and started teaching at the Academy of Art University where she taught until 2010.

=== University of Fashion ===
Sterlacci launched University of Fashion, an online library of fashion design videos, in 2013. Sterlacci felt that fashion design was declining in the US due to companies manufacturing off-shore, and she wanted to promote fashion design education. She got the idea of launching University of Fashion while teaching at Fashion Institute of Technology and the Academy of Art University and felt that students "didn’t want to rely on books; they wanted videos."

== In the media ==
During the 80s, her designs were featured in magazines such as Vogue, Elle and Glamour and her work has appeared on the covers of Women's Wear Daily and Harpers Bazaar, as well as in The New York Times and The Record.

In 1982, Women's Wear Daily wrote about her leather collection that "in a year when leather clothing of all kinds and qualities is flooding the market, Francesca Sterlacci's Maderia-work leathers for Penthouse G stand out for the quality of their execution and the success with which they translate traditional techniques to modern sensibilities."

In 1986, Women's Wear Daily called her a "shoestring entrepreneur" referring to the fact that she worked without financial backers or factors. She was featured in Chicago Voice in August 1988 that wrote about her "a young fashion designer who is fast becoming a fashion leader is Francesca Sterlacci. Her trendsetting spring collection is designed for now with one foot in the future."

== Bibliography ==
- Historical Dictionary of the Fashion Industry (Second Edition), with Joanne Arbuckle (2017) ISBN 978-1442239081
- Leather Apparel Design (1997) ISBN 978-0827377721
- Historical Dictionary of the Fashion Industry, with Joanne Arbuckle (2007) ISBN 978-0810854543
- The A to Z of the Fashion Industry (2009) ISBN 978-0810868830
- Leather Fashion Design (Portfolio Skills) (2010) ISBN 978-1856696715
