= MGM Children's Matinees =

MGM Children's Matinees were a series of vintage MGM family films curated by executive Tony Myerberg that were re-released to theatres between 1970 and 1973. As the name implies, they were shown only as Saturday and Sunday matinées. The series was likely inspired by the success of lower-budgeted children's films released on weekend matinees by K. Gordon Murray and Barry Yellen's Childhood Productions.

== List of titles ==
The films ranged from old favorites such as The Wizard of Oz (1939), Lassie Come Home (1943), and The Secret Garden (1949), to later widescreen films such as the 1960 remake of The Adventures of Huckleberry Finn, to then-recent fare such as Clarence, the Cross-Eyed Lion.

It also featured the 1970 Chuck Jones cult feature The Phantom Tollbooth.

== History ==
All the trailers for the films in the series were newly created, using footage from the original trailers of the films, and combining them with new narration. For example, the narration for the series trailer for Forbidden Planet targeted the boys in the audience and focused solely on the science fiction elements, and "Robby the Robot", and none of the romance between Leslie Nielsen and Anne Francis.

The series was officially discontinued after 1973, though in some markets, theatres continued to program films using MGM's ad materials into the late 1970s.

== Competitors ==
Tony Myerberg left MGM, and set up a similar franchise at Paramount Pictures, Paramount Family Matinee, that also repackaged reissues of family films owned by the studio like Hello Down There (1968), Willy Wonka and the Chocolate Factory (1971), Black Beauty (1971), and Charlotte's Web (1973), with acquisitions from other producers, including Alice in a New Wonderland (1966), Tom Thumb (1972), Aladdin and His Magic Lamp (1970), The Magic of the Kite (1958), Kingdom in the Clouds (1969), Rumpelstiltskin (1955), Heidi, Child of the Mountain (1952) and its sequel Heidi and Peter (1955).

The series officially ran from 1974 until 1976.

== See also ==
- Clubhouse Pictures, the family-friendly label of Atlantic Releasing Corporation that ran from 1986 until 1987.
- Warner Bros. Family Entertainment, the family film and television brand of Warner Bros. Entertainment which lasted from 1992 to 2009.
- Turner Classic Movies
