= Wizard of Oz Museum =

Museum in Cocoa Beach, Florida

The Wizard of Oz Museum
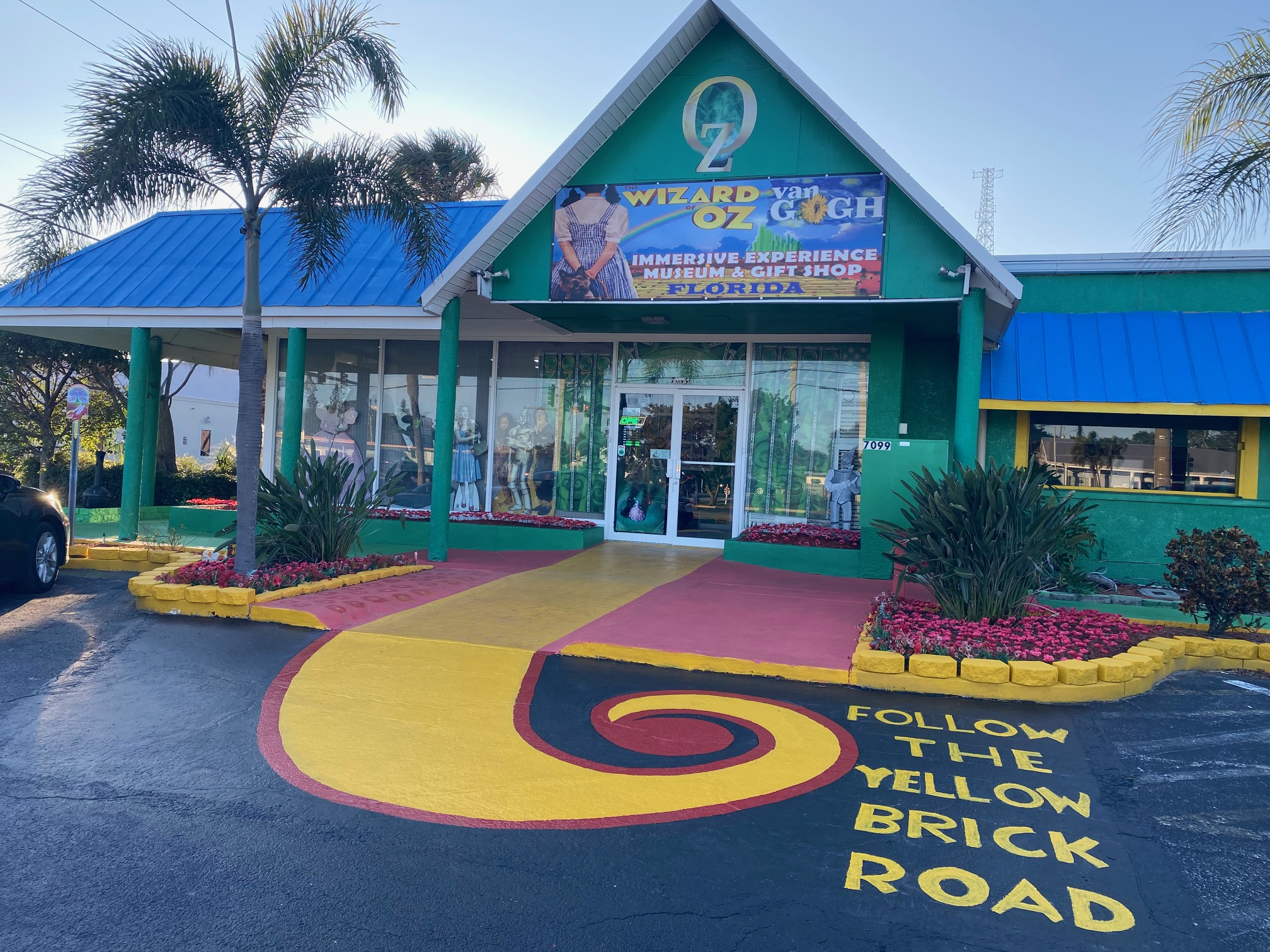

- Location within Florida
- Established: 2022
- Location: 333 W Cocoa Beach Cswy; Cocoa Beach, Florida
- Coordinates: 28.3588°N 80.6117°W
- Type: Culture, History, Children's Museum, Art Museum
- Curator: Fred Trust
- Website: wizardofozflorida.com

The Wizard of Oz Museum is located in Cocoa Beach, Florida, and features a large collection of Wizard of Oz memorabilia. This highly rated museum houses over 3,000 artifacts; of note the Original “Dorothy” Dress worn by Judy Garland, the first known published copy of The Wonderful Wizard of Oz signed by L. Frank Baum, The Original Script #1 owned by producer Melvin Leroy, Cowardly Lion Gloves worn by Bert Lahr, Munchkin Townsman Jacket Screen-used costume, a Winkie Guard Spear Original prop, a waist-length reddish fox-raccoon jacket owned by Judy Garland, monogrammed with her initials JG, and an oil painting by artist Natalia Babi of China Girl from the 2013 Disney movie Oz the Great and Powerful.

Those visiting the museum will also have the opportunity to participate in both the Wizard of Oz immersive experience and the Van Gogh immersive experience. The immersive experience also showcases imagery from the James Webb Space Telescope due to its ties to the space industry. The experiences are brought to life by over 30 projectors in a large room where visitors can take a seat and be transported into the worlds of Oz and Van Gogh. The museum features several replicas of different movie characters. They also have many activities for children, they offer the option to play a scavenger hunt throughout the museum including a kids’ room. Additionally, the museum gift shop offers visitors a wide variety of keepsakes for purchase, ranging from rare collectables to souvenirs.

The museum recently moved to a new location in Cocoa Beach. They have kept all the same elements of the original museum; however, they are adding in elements from I Dream of Jeannie, an American fantasy sitcom television series that was set in Cocoa Beach.
