= The Wizard of Oz =

1939 film based on L. Frank Baum's book

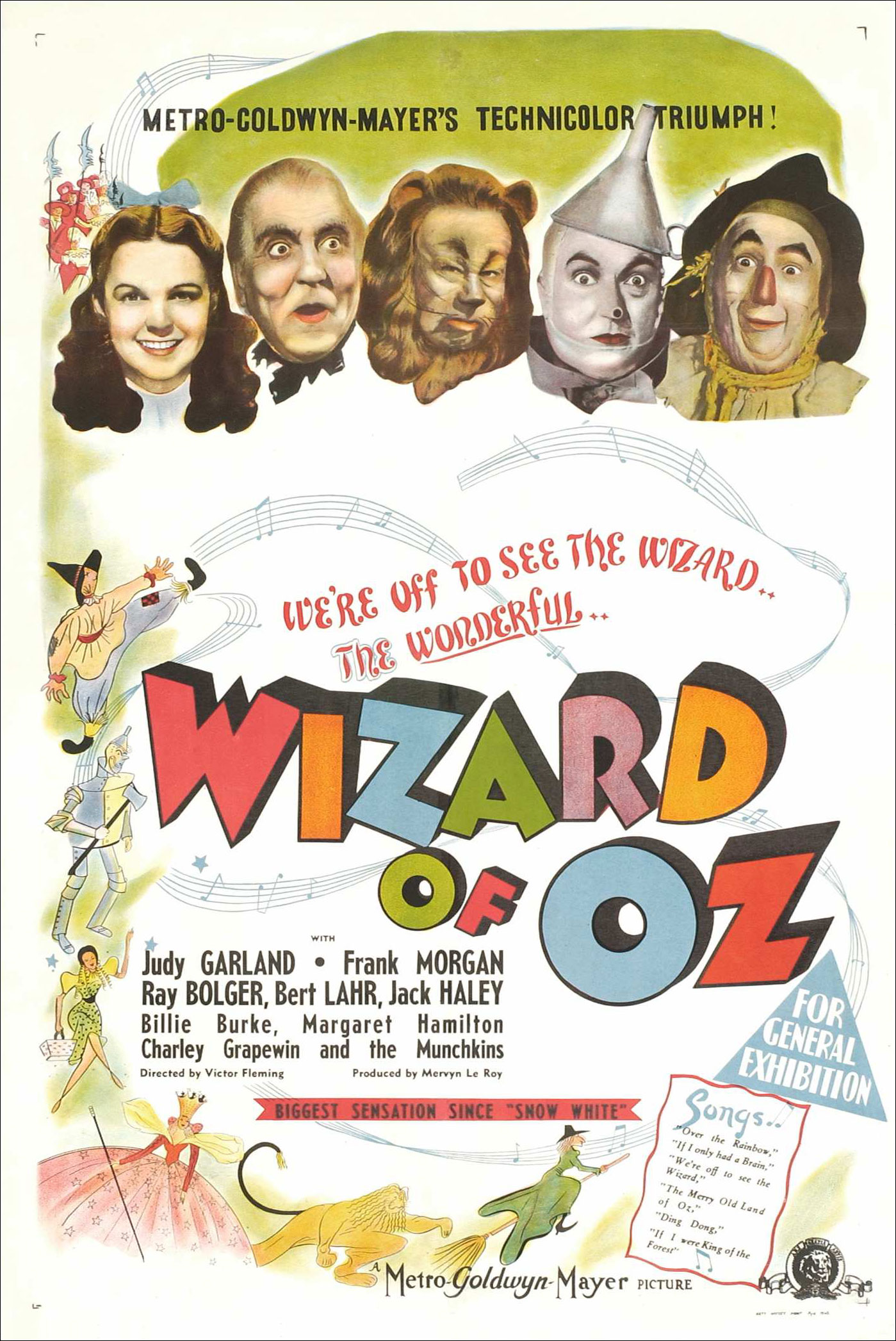
- Theatrical release poster
- Directed by: Victor Fleming (Note: King Vidor did some additional directorial input after Fleming's departure, mainly on the sepiatone Kansas scenes; three other directors were previously involved: Norman Taurog (who directed some Technicolor test sequences), Richard Thorpe (who was dismissed for rushing through the shoot), and George Cukor (as an intermediary before leaving to direct Gone with the Wind). Also, Mervyn LeRoy, the producer on the film, did some brief stints as director for some transitional scenes. All the aforementioned directors were uncredited.)
- Screenplay by: Noel Langley; Florence Ryerson; Edgar Allan Woolf (Note: Although Langley, Ryerson and Woolf received credit for the screenplay, directors Richard Thorpe, George Cukor and King Vidor, along with Irving Brecher, Herbert Fields, Arthur Freed, Yip Harburg, Samuel Hoffenstein, Jack Mintz, and Sid Silvers, worked on the script in the course of development.)
- Adaptation by: Noel Langley
- Based on: The Wonderful Wizard of Oz by L. Frank Baum
- Produced by: Mervyn LeRoy
- Starring: Judy Garland; Frank Morgan; Ray Bolger; Bert Lahr; Jack Haley; Billie Burke; Margaret Hamilton; Charley Grapewin
- Cinematography: Harold Rosson
- Edited by: Blanche Sewell
- Music by: Herbert Stothart
- Production company: Metro-Goldwyn-Mayer
- Distributed by: Loew's Inc.
- Release dates: August 10, 1939 (Green Bay, Wisconsin); August 25, 1939 (United States)
- Running time: 102 minutes
- Country: United States
- Language: English
- Budget: $2.77 million
- Box office: $25.6 million

The Wizard of Oz is a 1939 American musical fantasy film produced by Metro-Goldwyn-Mayer. Based on the 1900 novel The Wonderful Wizard of Oz by L. Frank Baum, it was primarily directed by Victor Fleming, who left production to take over the troubled Gone with the Wind. The screenplay is credited to Noel Langley, Florence Ryerson, and Edgar Allan Woolf, but includes contributions from other writers. The film stars Judy Garland, Frank Morgan, Ray Bolger, Jack Haley, Bert Lahr, Billie Burke, and Margaret Hamilton. The music was composed by Harold Arlen and adapted by Herbert Stothart, with lyrics by Edgar "Yip" Harburg.

The film is celebrated for its use of three-strip Technicolor, fantasy storytelling, musical score, and memorable characters. It was a critical success and was nominated for five Academy Awards, including Best Picture, winning Best Original Song for "Over the Rainbow" and Best Original Score for Stothart; the Academy Juvenile Award was presented to Judy Garland. It was on a preliminary list of submissions from the studios for an Academy Award for Cinematography (Color) but was not nominated. While it was sufficiently popular at the box office, it failed to make a profit until its 1949 re-release, earning only $3 million on a $2.7 million budget, making it MGM's most expensive production at the time.

The 1956 television broadcast premiere of the film on CBS reintroduced it to the public. According to the U.S. Library of Congress, it is the most seen film in cinematic history. In the inaugural class of 1989, it was selected by the Library of Congress as one of the first 25 films for preservation in the United States National Film Registry for being "culturally, historically, or aesthetically significant". It is also one of the few films on UNESCO's Memory of the World international register. It was ranked second in Variety's inaugural 100 Greatest Movies of All Time list published in 2022. It was among the top ten in the 2005 British Film Institute (BFI) list of 50 Films to be Seen by the Age of 14 and is on the BFI's updated list of 50 Films to be Seen by the Age of 15 released in May 2020. It has become the source of many quotes referenced in contemporary popular culture. It frequently ranks on critics' lists of the greatest films in history and is the most commercially successful adaptation of Baum's work.

== Plot ==
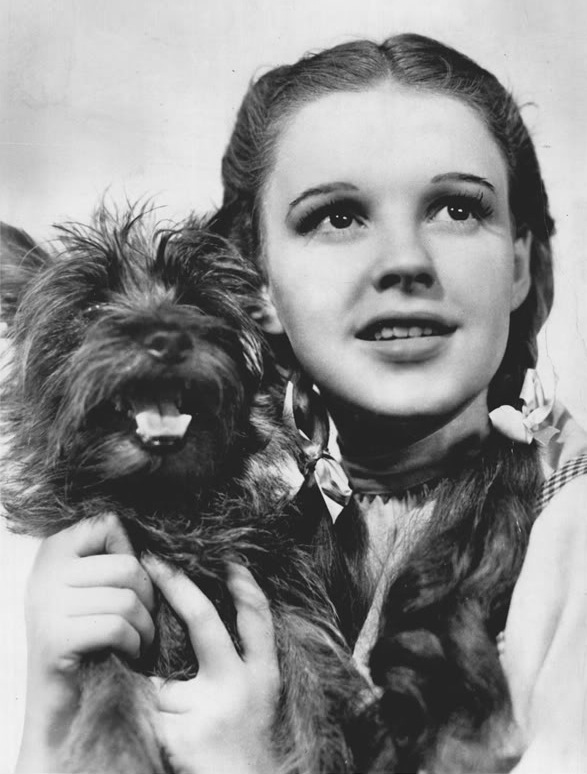
Judy Garland as Dorothy Gale and Terry as Toto

Dorothy Gale lives on a Kansas farm with her Uncle Henry and Aunt Em. Her dog Toto is seized by neighbor Almira Gulch, who has obtained a sheriff's order after being bitten by him. Toto escapes and returns to Dorothy, who runs away to protect him. Professor Marvel, a charlatan fortune teller, leads Dorothy to believe that Aunt Em is sick with heartbreak, which prompts Dorothy to return home. She returns just as a tornado approaches the farm. Unable to get into the locked storm cellar, she takes cover in the farmhouse and is knocked unconscious by a blown out window while inside. She seemingly awakens to find the house moving through the air, with her and Toto still inside it. Various figures float by, including Gulch, who morphs into a witch.

The house comes down in an unknown land, which turns out to be Munchkinland in the Land of Oz. Dorothy is greeted by a good witch named Glinda, who comes down in a bubble and informs her that the house landed on the Wicked Witch of the East, killing her. The Munchkins celebrate the witch's death, until her sister, the Wicked Witch of the West, shows up. Before she can claim her deceased sister's ruby slippers, Glinda magically transports them onto Dorothy's feet and tells her to keep them on. The wicked witch leaves, but swears vengeance upon Dorothy and Toto. Glinda, before vanishing out of sight in another bubble, tells Dorothy that the Wizard in the Emerald City is the only one who might be able to help her return home. Dorothy sets out down the yellow brick road to see him.

Along the way, Dorothy meets the Scarecrow, who wants a brain; the Tin Man, who wants a heart; and the Cowardly Lion, who wants courage. They join Dorothy, hoping that the Wizard can help them as well. They reach the Emerald City, despite the efforts of the Wicked Witch. The Wizard appears as a giant ghostly head and tells them he will grant their wishes if they bring him the Wicked Witch's broom.

During their quest, Dorothy and Toto are captured by flying monkeys and taken to the Wicked Witch's castle. Toto escapes, and leads the Scarecrow, Tin Man, and Cowardly Lion to the castle. They free Dorothy, but are pursued and finally cornered by the Witch and her guards, the Winkies. She taunts them and sets fire to the Scarecrow's arm. When Dorothy throws a bucket of water onto him, she inadvertently splashes the Witch, causing her to melt away. The Winkies gratefully give Dorothy the Witch's broom, and the group returns to the Wizard, but he tells them to come back the next day. They protest, and Toto pulls back a curtain, revealing the "Wizard" to be an ordinary man operating machinery. When they confront him, he confesses to being a humbug, but "grants" Dorothy's friends' wishes by giving them tokens to confirm that they had the qualities they sought.

The Wizard reveals that he, like Dorothy, is from Kansas and accidentally arrived in Oz in a hot air balloon. He attempts to take her back to Kansas aboard it, but when Toto jumps out and Dorothy goes after him, the balloon lifts off with just the Wizard aboard. Glinda then reappears and tells Dorothy she always had the power to return to Kansas using the ruby slippers, but had to find that out for herself. After sharing a tearful farewell with her friends, Dorothy clicks her heels three times and repeats, "There's no place like home."

Dorothy awakens in her own bed in Kansas. She recounts her adventures, but Aunt Em says that she just had a bad dream. Dorothy tells Professor Marvel and the farmhands that they were in Oz also, and they smile, humoring her. As she hugs Toto, she gratefully exclaims, "Oh, Auntie Em, there's no place like home!"

== Cast ==
In order of appearance on the film's closing credits list. Whenever a Kansas character has a counterpart in Oz, only that Kansas character is listed in the film's credits. For example, Frank Morgan is listed as playing Professor Marvel, but not the Wizard of Oz. The only Oz characters listed in the credits are Glinda, Nikko, and the Munchkins.

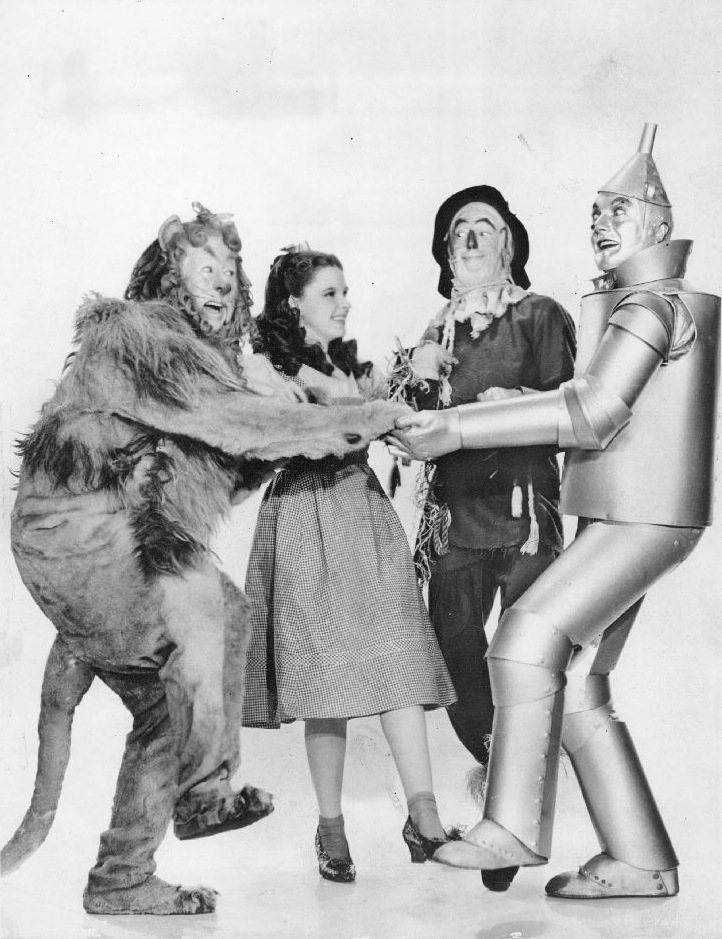
Left to right: The Cowardly Lion, Dorothy, the Scarecrow, and the Tin Man

- Judy Garland as Dorothy Gale
- Frank Morgan as Professor Marvel/Wizard of Oz/Gatekeeper/Carriage Driver/Wizard's Guard
- Ray Bolger as Hunk/Scarecrow
- Bert Lahr as Zeke/Cowardly Lion
- Jack Haley as Hickory/Tin Man
- Billie Burke as Glinda the Good Witch of the North
- Margaret Hamilton as Almira Gulch/Wicked Witch of the West
- Charley Grapewin as Uncle Henry
- Pat Walshe as Nikko (leader of the Winged Monkeys)
- Clara Blandick as Aunt Em
- Terry ("Toto") as Toto
- The Singer Midgets as the Munchkins (See Munchkin § Actors and actresses)

=== Uncredited cast members ===
- Mitchell Lewis as Winkie Guard Captain
- Adriana Caselotti as the voice of Juliet in the Tin Man's song "If I Only Had a Heart"
- Candy Candido as the voice of the angry apple tree

== Production ==
=== Development ===
Production on the film began when Walt Disney's Snow White and the Seven Dwarfs (1937) showed that films adapted from popular children's stories and fairytales could be successful. In January 1938, Metro-Goldwyn-Mayer bought the rights to L. Frank Baum's popular novel The Wonderful Wizard of Oz from Samuel Goldwyn. Goldwyn had considered making the film as a vehicle for Eddie Cantor, who was under contract to Samuel Goldwyn Productions and whom Goldwyn wanted to cast as the Scarecrow.

The script went through at least ten screenwriters. Mervyn LeRoy's assistant, William H. Cannon, submitted a brief four-page outline on February 26, 1938. Due to the poor commercial performance of recent fantasy films, Cannon recommended reducing or eliminating fantastical elements. In his outline, the Scarecrow was a man so stupid that the only employment open to him was scaring crows from cornfields. The Tin Woodman was recharacterized as a criminal so heartless that he was sentenced to be placed in a tin suit for eternity. This torture softened him into somebody gentler and kinder. Cannon's vision was rejected by LeRoy and Arthur Freed.

In early March, LeRoy hired screenwriter Irving Brecher to write a new story treatment. However, his treatment was also rejected and LeRoy reassigned Brecher on the Marx Brothers comedy At the Circus (1939). Next, LeRoy hired screenwriter Herman J. Mankiewicz, who delivered a 17-page draft of the Kansas scenes on March 3, 1938. Four days later, Mankiewicz delivered a further 56 pages. That same month, LeRoy also hired Noel Langley and poet Ogden Nash to write separate story treatments. None of these three knew about the others, a common practice at the time. While Nash delivered a four-page outline, Langley submitted a 43-page treatment on March 22. A day later, Mankiewicz was taken off the project. Langley then turned in three more scripts, this time incorporating the songs written by Harold Arlen and Yip Harburg.

On June 3, 1938, Florence Ryerson and Edgar Allan Woolf were assigned on The Wizard of Oz. They were asked to ensure that the story stayed true to Baum's book. Ten days later, they submitted a script, in which they added the Wizard—known as Professor Marvel—in Kansas. Their second script, submitted on July 5, trimmed down Langley's dialogue with their own. However, Freed disliked their work and reassigned it to Langley, who promptly replaced all of their dialogue with his own.

They completed the production draft of the script on October 8, 1938, following numerous rewrites. When Victor Fleming was later hired to take over direction of Oz, he asked John Lee Mahin to revise the script further, adding and cutting some scenes. Mahin's major contribution was a full rewrite of the film's first scene. Jack Haley and Bert Lahr are also known to have written some of their dialogue for the Kansas sequence. Others who contributed to the adaptation without credit include three of the men who directed portions of the film or shoot, Richard Thorpe, George Cukor and King Vidor; along with other writers Irving Brecher, Herbert Fields, Arthur Freed, Yip Harburg, Samuel Hoffenstein, Jack Mintz, and Sid Silvers. Only Langley, Ryerson, and Woolf were credited for the script.

In addition, songwriter Harburg's son (and biographer) Ernie Harburg reported:

So anyhow, Yip also wrote all the dialogue in that time and the setup to the songs and he also wrote the part where they give out the heart, the brains, and the nerve, because he was the final script editor. And he – there was eleven screenwriters on that – and he pulled the whole thing together, wrote his own lines and gave the thing a coherence and unity which made it a work of art. But he doesn't get credit for that. He gets lyrics by E. Y. Harburg, you see. But nevertheless, he put his influence on the thing.

Langley seems to have thought that a 1939 audience was too sophisticated to accept Oz as a straight-ahead fantasy; therefore, it was reconceived as a lengthy, elaborate dream sequence. Because they perceived a need to attract a youthful audience by appealing to modern trends and styles, Freed suggested two characters not in the original Baum stories: the "Princess of Oz" who sings operetta and "the Prince". The roles were envisioned with Betty Jaynes and Kenny Baker, respectively. Baker's role was rewritten into a grand duke, and then back to a prince, before the part was removed altogether. One scene highlighted the vocal contrast between the operatic princess against Dorothy Gale, who sings in swing style. The scene was removed, though Garland and Jaynes shared a duet in Babes in Arms (1939).

Another scene, which was removed before final script approval and never filmed, was an epilogue scene in Kansas after Dorothy's return. Hunk (the Kansan counterpart to the Scarecrow) is leaving for an agricultural college and extracts a promise from Dorothy to write to him. The scene implies that romance will eventually develop between the two, which also may have been intended as an explanation for Dorothy's partiality for the Scarecrow over her other two companions. This plot idea was never totally dropped, and is especially noticeable in the final script when Dorothy, just before she is to leave Oz, tells the Scarecrow, "I think I'll miss you most of all".

Much attention was given to the use of color in the production, with the MGM production crew favoring some hues over others. It took the studio's art department almost a week to settle on the shade of yellow used for the yellow brick road.

=== Casting ===
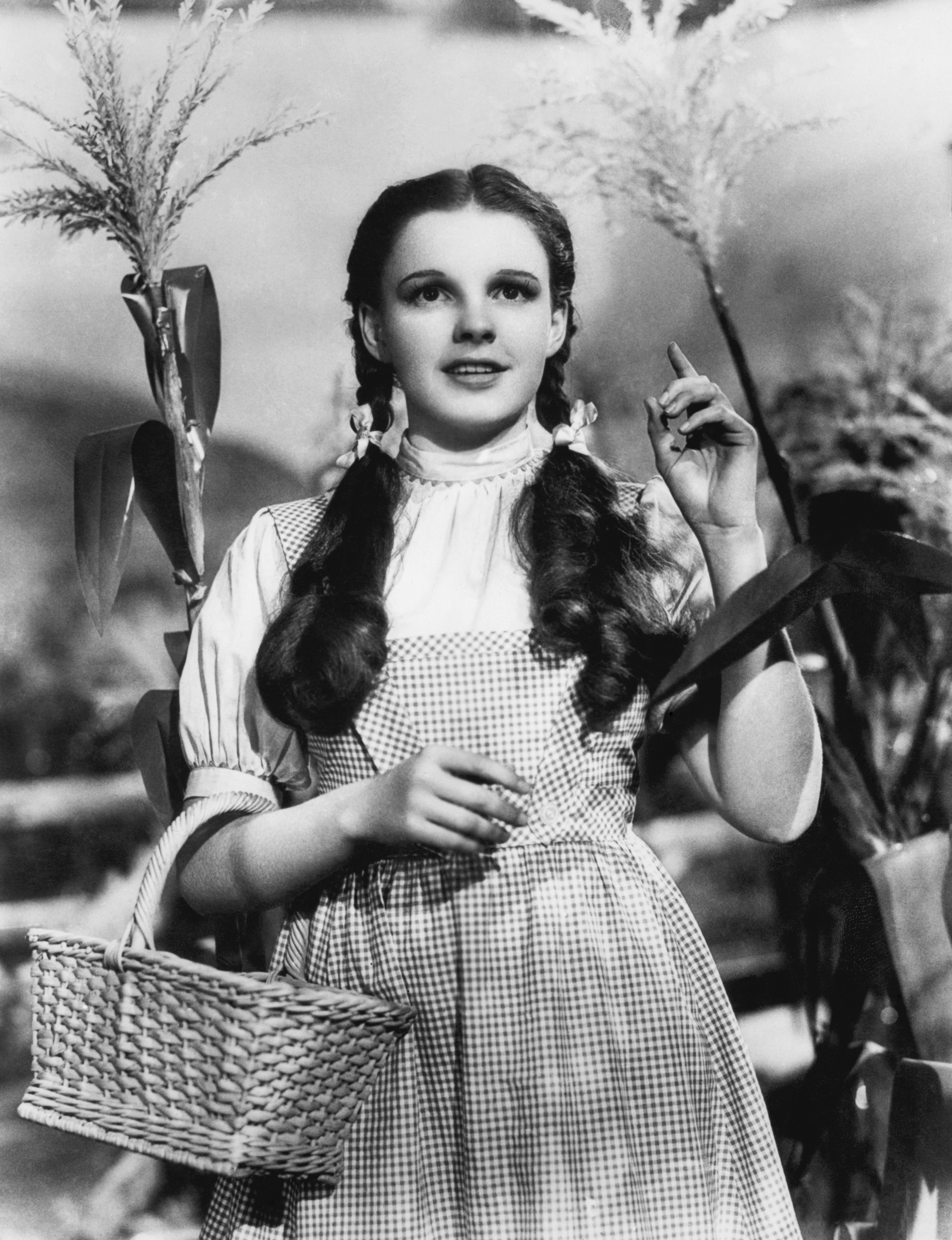
Judy Garland as Dorothy

Several actresses were reportedly considered for the part of Dorothy, including Shirley Temple from 20th Century Fox, the most prominent child star at the time; Deanna Durbin, a relative newcomer with a recognized operatic voice; and Judy Garland, the most experienced of the three. Officially, the decision to cast Garland was attributed to contractual issues.

Ebsen's costume test as the Tin Man

Ray Bolger was originally cast as the Tin Man and Buddy Ebsen was to play the Scarecrow. Bolger, however, longed to play the Scarecrow, as his childhood idol Fred Stone had done on stage in 1902. With that very performance, Stone had inspired Bolger to become a vaudevillian in the first place. Now unhappy with his role as the Tin Man (reportedly claiming, "I'm not a tin performer; I'm fluid"), Bolger convinced producer Mervyn LeRoy to recast him in the part he so desired. Ebsen did not object; after going over the basics of the Scarecrow's distinctive gait with Bolger (as a professional dancer, Ebsen had been cast because the studio was confident he would be up to the task of replicating the famous "wobbly-walk" of Stone's Scarecrow), he recorded all of his songs, went through all the rehearsals as the Tin Man and began filming with the rest of the cast.

W. C. Fields was originally chosen for the title role of the Wizard of Oz after Ed Wynn turned it down, considering the part "too small", but the studio could not meet Fields' fee. Wallace Beery lobbied for the role, but the studio refused to spare him during the long shooting schedule. Instead, another contract player, Frank Morgan, was cast on September 22.

Veteran vaudeville performer Pat Walshe was best known for his performance as various monkeys in several theater productions and circus shows. He was cast as Nikko, the commander of the winged monkeys, on September 28, traveling to the MGM studios on October 3.

An extensive talent search produced over a hundred dwarfs to play Munchkins; this meant that most of the film's Oz sequences would have to be shot before work on the Munchkinland sequence could begin. According to Munchkin actor Jerry Maren, the dwarfs were each paid over $125 a week (equivalent to $2,900 in 2025). Meinhardt Raabe, who played the coroner, revealed in the 1990 documentary The Making of the Wizard of Oz that the MGM costume and wardrobe department, under the direction of designer Adrian, had to design over 100 costumes for the Munchkin sequences. They photographed and cataloged each Munchkin in their costume so they could consistently apply the same costume and makeup each day of production.

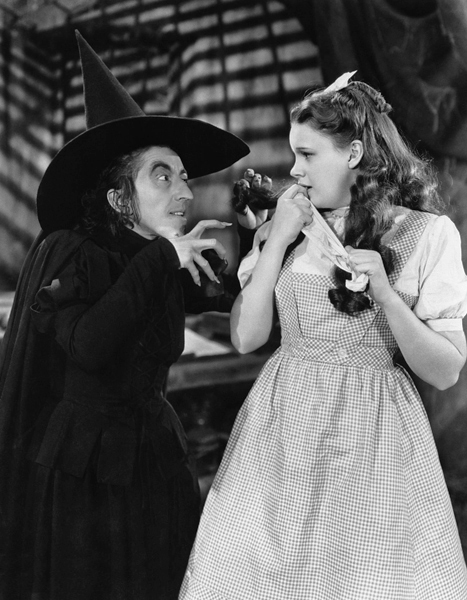
Margaret Hamilton as the Wicked Witch of the West with Judy Garland as Dorothy

Gale Sondergaard was originally cast as the Wicked Witch of the West, but withdrew from the role when the witch's persona shifted from sly and glamorous (thought to emulate the Evil Queen in Disney's Snow White and the Seven Dwarfs) to the familiar "ugly hag". She was replaced on October 10, 1938, just two days before filming started, by MGM contract player Margaret Hamilton. Sondergaard said in an interview that she had no regrets about turning down the part. Sondergaard would go on to play a glamorous feline villainess in 20th Century Fox's version of Maurice Maeterlinck's The Blue Bird (1940). Hamilton played a role remarkably similar to the Wicked Witch in the Judy Garland film Babes in Arms (1939).

According to Aljean Harmetz, the "gone-to-seed" coat worn by Morgan as the Wizard was selected from a rack of coats purchased from a second-hand shop. According to legend, Morgan later discovered a label in the coat indicating it had once belonged to Baum, Baum's widow confirmed this, and the coat was eventually presented to her. However, Baum biographer Michael Patrick Hearn says the Baum family denies ever seeing the coat or knowing of the story; Hamilton considered it a rumor concocted by the studio.

=== Filming ===
==== Richard Thorpe begins direction; Ebsen replaced by Haley ====
Production of The Wizard of Oz began on October 13, 1938, under the direction of MGM contract director Richard Thorpe, who began with the scene of Dorothy meeting the Scarecrow in Oz. He would ultimately only serve as Oz's director for 11 shooting days before being re-assigned by a dissatisfied Mervyn LeRoy.

The production faced the challenge of creating the Tin Man's costume. Several tests were done to find the right makeup and clothes for Ebsen. Ten days into the shoot, Ebsen suffered a toxic reaction after repeatedly inhaling the aluminum dust (which his daughter, Kiki Ebsen, has said the studio misrepresented as an "allergic reaction") contained in the aluminum powder makeup he wore. He recalled taking a breath one evening, and "nothin' happened," Ebsen's way of saying he wasn't receiving any air into his system. He wrote in a letter about his breathing problems, stating: "Unfortunately, two weeks later, i could hardly breathe at all". He was hospitalized in critical condition. He spent two weeks on oxygen and was subsequently forced to leave the project. In a later interview (included on the 2005 DVD release of The Wizard of Oz), he recalled that the studio heads appreciated the seriousness of his illness only after he was hospitalized. Filming halted while a replacement for him was sought.

No footage of Ebsen as the Tin Man has ever been released, only photos taken during filming and makeup tests. His replacement Jack Haley assumed Ebsen had been fired. The makeup used for Haley was quietly changed to an aluminum paste, with a layer of clown white greasepaint underneath, to protect his skin. Although it did not have the same dire effect on Haley, he did at one point suffer an eye infection from it. To keep down on production costs, Haley only rerecorded "If I Only Had a Heart" and solo lines during "If I Only Had the Nerve" and the scrapped song "The Jitterbug"; therefore, Ebsen's voice can still be heard in the remaining songs featuring the Tin Man in group vocals.

==== George Cukor's brief stint ====
LeRoy, after reviewing the footage and feeling director Richard Thorpe was rushing the production, adversely affecting the actors' performances, had Thorpe replaced. During reorganization on the production, George Cukor temporarily took over under LeRoy's guidance. Initially, the studio had made Garland wear a blonde wig and heavy "baby-doll" makeup, and she played Dorothy in an exaggerated fashion under Thorpe's direction. Cukor changed Garland's and Hamilton's makeup and costumes, and told Garland to "be herself". This meant that all the scenes Garland and Hamilton had already completed had to be reshot. Cukor also suggested the studio cast Jack Haley, on loan from Fox, as the Tin Man.

==== Victor Fleming, the main director ====
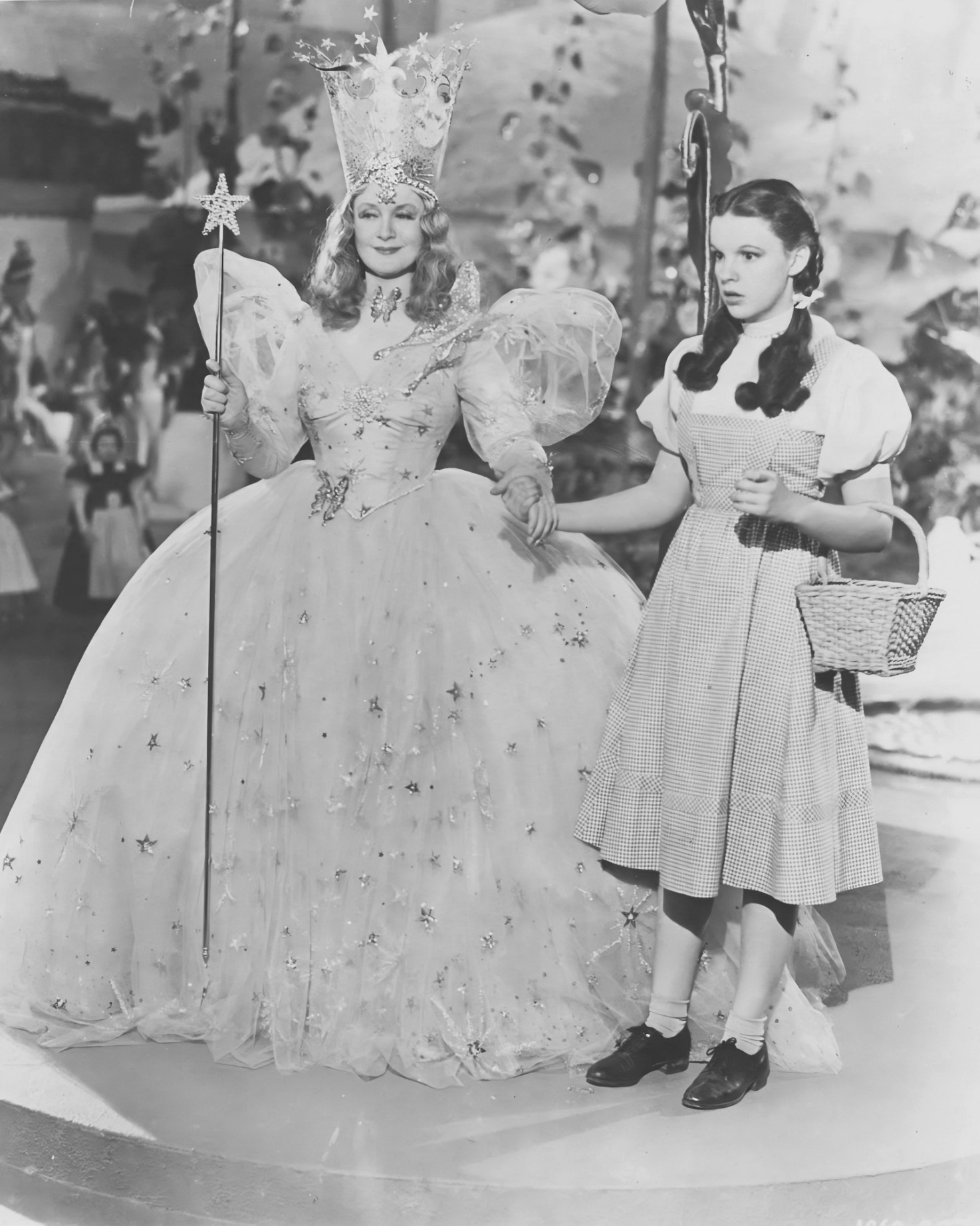
Still of Billie Burke as Glinda and Judy Garland as Dorothy

Cukor did not shoot any scenes for the film, but acted merely as a creative advisor to the troubled production. His prior commitment to direct Gone with the Wind (1939) required him to leave on November 3, 1938, when Victor Fleming assumed directorial responsibility. As director, Fleming chose not to shift the film from Cukor's creative realignment. Producer LeRoy had already expressed his satisfaction with the film's new course.

All the Oz sequences were filmed in three-strip Technicolor, requiring the use of large, hot lights, while the opening and closing credits, and the Kansas sequences, were filmed in black and white and colored in a sepia-tone process. Sepia-tone film was also used in the scene where Aunt Em appears in the Wicked Witch's crystal ball.

The Wizard of Oz was not the first film to use Technicolor, which had been introduced in The Gulf Between (1917) as a two-color additive process. Oz was also not the first to use three-strip Technicolor, the three-color subtractive process (officially known as "Technicolor Process 4" or "Glorious Technicolor") which allowed for a wider range of reproducible hues compared to the earlier Technicolor processes. Three-strip Technicolor had its live-action debut in a sequence for an earlier MGM feature, the Jeanette MacDonald musical The Cat and the Fiddle (1934) and then made its first three-strip Technicolor process that same year in a Traveltalks' travelogue short Holland in Tulip Time (1934). Becky Sharp (1935), a Pioneer Pictures/RKO Radio production, was the first feature fully produced in three-strip Technicolor, The Trail of the Lonesome Pine (1936), a Paramount/Walter Wanger production, which was the first fully produced film to be shot outdoors, Dancing Pirate (1936), also produced by the makers of Becky Sharp, was the third feature film and the first musical in that format, The Garden of Allah (1936), a Selznick International/United Artists production, was the fourth film fully produced in the process, and another Jeanette MacDonald musical, Sweethearts (1938), was MGM's first feature fully produced in the process, four years earlier since the release of the Traveltalks short film Holland in Tulip Time. It was during the production of Sweethearts that convinced MGM to produce most of The Wizard of Oz in Technicolor, a decision also justified by the concurrent blockbuster success of another Technicolor RKO release, that being Walt Disney's animated Snow White and the Seven Dwarfs (1937).

Production on the bulk of the Technicolor sequences was a long and exhausting process that ran for over six months, from October 1938 to March 1939. Most of the cast worked six days a week and had to arrive as early as 4 am to be fitted with makeup and costumes, and often did not leave until 7 pm or later. Cumbersome makeup and costumes were made even more uncomfortable by the daylight-bright lighting the early Technicolor process required, which could heat the set to over 100 °F (38 °C); this also had the side effect of bringing the production's electricity bill to a staggering estimate of $225,000 (equivalent to $5,207,835 in 2025). Bolger later said that the frightening nature of the costumes prevented most of the Oz principals from eating in the studio commissary. Though a rumor circulates that the toxicity of Hamilton's copper-based makeup forced her to eat a liquid diet through a straw on shoot days, she was allowed to eat "sandwiches and celery" but had to be extremely careful not to ingest any of the pigment. It took as many as twelve takes to have Toto run alongside the actors as they skipped down the Yellow Brick Road.

In Hamilton's exit from Munchkinland, a concealed elevator was installed to lower her below stage level, as fire and smoke erupted to dramatize and conceal her exit. The first take ran well, but on the second take, the burst of fire came too soon. The flames set fire to her green, copper-based face paint, causing third-degree burns to her hands and face. She spent three months recuperating before returning to work. Her green makeup had usually been removed with acetone due to its toxic copper content. Because of Hamilton's burns, makeup artist Jack Young removed the makeup with alcohol to prevent infection.

==== On-set treatment and abuse allegations ====
In the decades since the film's release, credible stories have come out indicating that Judy Garland endured extensive abuse during and before filming. The studio went to extreme lengths to change her appearance, including binding her chest and giving her Benzedrine tablets to keep her weight down, along with uppers and downers that caused giggling fits. Victor Fleming slapped her during the Cowardly Lion's introduction scene when Garland could not stop laughing at Lahr's performance. Once the scene was done, Fleming, reportedly ashamed of himself, ordered the crew to punch him in the face. Garland, however, kissed him instead. She continued to wear false teeth that fit over her own upper teeth that were misaligned. She also wore a rubber disc in each nostril to change the shape of her nose. She would wear the teeth and discs on camera for another five years until her involvement in Meet Me in St. Louis (1944), whereupon makeup artist Dorothy Ponedel promptly threw the teeth and discs in a drawer after Garland said, "I'm supposed to wear these." Claims have been made in memoirs that the frequently drunk actors portraying the Munchkins propositioned and pinched her. Garland said that she was groped by Louis B. Mayer.

== Special effects, makeup and costumes ==
Arnold Gillespie, the film's special effects director, employed several techniques. Developing the tornado scene was especially costly. Gillespie used muslin cloth to make the tornado flexible, after a previous attempt with rubber failed. He hung the 35 ft (11 m) of muslin from a steel gantry and connected the bottom to a rod. By moving the gantry and rod, he was able to create the illusion of a tornado moving across the stage. Fuller's earth was sprayed from both the top and bottom using compressed air hoses to complete the effect. Dorothy's house was recreated using a model. Stock footage of this tornado was later recycled for a climactic scene in the 1943 musical film Cabin in the Sky, directed by Garland's eventual second husband Vincente Minnelli, and High Barbaree (1947).

The Cowardly Lion and Scarecrow masks were made of foam latex makeup created by makeup artist Jack Dawn. Dawn was one of the first to use this technique. It took an hour each day to slowly peel Bolger's glued-on mask from his face, a process that eventually left permanent lines around his mouth and chin.

The Tin Man's costume was made of leather-covered buckram, and the oil used to grease his joints was made from chocolate syrup. The Cowardly Lion's costume was made from real lion skin and fur. Due to the heavy makeup, Bert Lahr could only consume soup and milkshakes during break, which eventually made him sick. After a few months, Lahr put his foot down and requested normal meals along with makeup redos after lunch. For the "horse of a different color" scene, Jell-O powder was used to color the white horses. Asbestos was used to achieve some of the special effects, such as the witch's burning broomstick and, after Hamilton was burned, she and Bolger were made additional costumes that contained asbestos for filming scenes involving fire. Contrary to popular belief, the fake snow that covers Dorothy as she sleeps in the field of poppies is made of white gypsum.

== Music ==
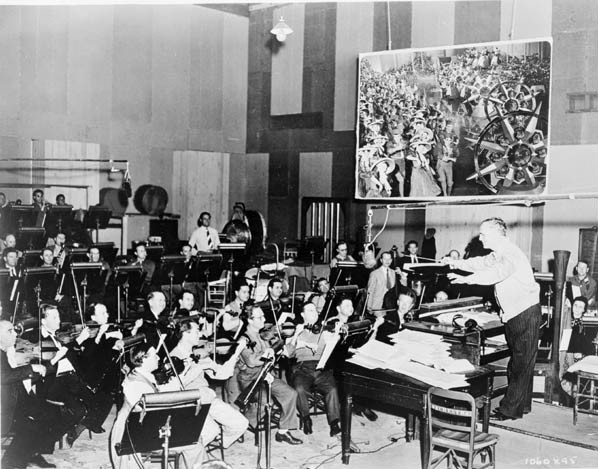
Herbert Stothart conducting the MGM Studio Orchestra for The Wizard of Oz, which was recorded at the MGM studios

The Wizard of Oz is famous for its musical selections and soundtrack. Its songs were composed by Harold Arlen, with lyrics by E. Y. "Yip" Harburg. They won the Academy Award for Best Original Song for "Over the Rainbow". The song ranks first in the AFI's 100 Years...100 Songs and the Recording Industry Association of America's "365 Songs of the Century".

MGM composer Herbert Stothart, a well-known Hollywood composer and songwriter, won the Academy Award for Best Original Score.

Georgie Stoll was associate conductor, and screen credit was given to George Bassman, Murray Cutter, Ken Darby and Paul Marquardt for orchestral and vocal arrangements. (As usual, Roger Edens was also heavily involved as a protégé for Freed.)

As the vocal arranger, Darby was responsible for the voices for the Munchkins and the Winkies. Since speeding up the vocal tracks was not possible at the time, Darby suggested to Douglas Shearer, the head of MGM's sound department, to use a metronome to record at 60 feet-per-minute rather than the standard 90. Shearer replied it was not possible, but instead they manufactured a new gear for the sound-recording machine. The King's Men, a quartet Darby had formed in 1928, were asked to record the vocals for the Lollipop Guild at a less slower rate, which was then played back one-fourth higher in pitch. For the Winkies, Darby used the exact opposite technique by recording the vocals at a faster-than-normal speed.

The songs were recorded on the studio's scoring stage before filming. Several of the recordings were completed while Ebsen was still with the cast. Although he had to be dropped from the cast because of a dangerous reaction to his aluminum powder makeup, Ebsen's singing voice remained on the soundtrack (as mentioned in the notes for the CD Deluxe Edition). He can be heard in the group vocals of "We're Off to See the Wizard".

Bolger's original recording of "If I Only Had a Brain" was far more sedate than the version in the film. During filming, Cukor and LeRoy decided a more energetic rendition better suited Dorothy's initial meeting with the Scarecrow, and it was rerecorded. The original version was considered lost until a copy was discovered in 2009.

=== Songs ===
All lyrics are written by E. Y. Harburg; all music is composed by Harold Arlen.

No.	Title	Performer(s)	Length
1.	"Over the Rainbow"	Judy Garland
2.	"Come Out, Come Out, Wherever You Are"	Billie Burke & The Munchkin Chorus
3.	"It Really Was No Miracle"	Judy Garland, Billy Bletcher & The Munchkin Chorus
4.	"We Thank You Very Sweetly"	Joseph Koziel & Frank Cucksey
5.	"Ding-Dong! The Witch Is Dead"	The Munchkin Chorus
6.	"As Mayor of the Munchkin City"	Billy Bletcher, Pinto Colvig & J. D. Jewkes
7.	"As Coroner, I Must Aver"	Harry Stanton
8.	"Ding-Dong! The Witch Is Dead (Reprise)"	The Munchkin Chorus
9.	"The Lullaby League"	Lorraine Bridges, Betty Rome & Carol Tevis
10.	"The Lollipop Guild"	Billy Bletcher, Pinto Colvig & Harry Stanton
11.	"We Welcome You to Munchkinland"	The Munchkin Chorus
12.	"Follow the Yellow Brick Road"	Judy Garland & The Munchkin Chorus
13.	"If I Only Had a Brain"	Ray Bolger & Judy Garland
14.	"We're Off to See the Wizard"	Judy Garland & Ray Bolger
15.	"If I Only Had a Heart"	Jack Haley & Adriana Caselotti
16.	"We're Off to See the Wizard (Reprise)"	Judy Garland, Ray Bolger & Buddy Ebsen
17.	"If I Only Had the Nerve"	Bert Lahr, Jack Haley, Judy Garland & Ray Bolger
18.	"We're Off to See the Wizard (Reprise 2)"	Judy Garland, Ray Bolger, Buddy Ebsen & Bert Lahr
19.	"Optimistic Voices"	The Debutantes & The Rhythmettes
20.	"The Merry Old Land of Oz"	Frank Morgan, Judy Garland, Ray Bolger, Jack Haley, Bert Lahr, Tyler Brooke, Ralph Sudam, Bobby Watson, Oliver Smith, Charles Irwin, Lois January, Elvida Rizzo, Lorraine Bridges & Chorus
21.	"If I Were King of the Forest"	Bert Lahr
22.	"The Jitterbug" (outtake)	Judy Garland, Ray Bolger, Jack Haley & Bert Lahr
23.	"Over the Rainbow (Reprise)" (outtake)	Judy Garland
24.	"Hail! Hail! The Witch Is Dead!" (outtake)	Ken Darby & MGM Studio Chorus

=== Deleted songs ===
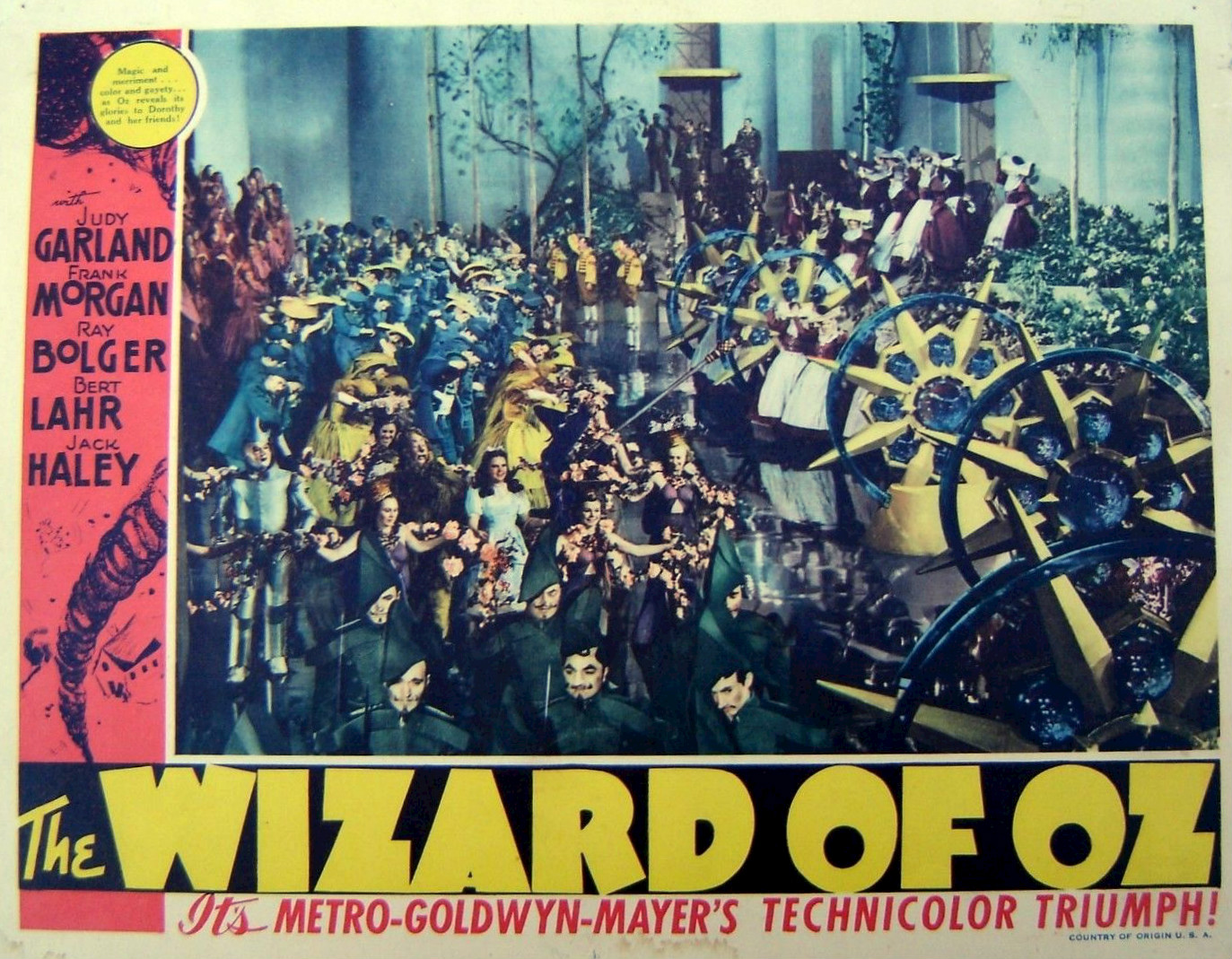
Lobby card with still of deleted musical number "Hail! Hail! The Witch Is Dead!", sung upon the return to the Emerald City

Some musical pieces were filmed and deleted later, in the editing process.

The song "The Jitterbug", written in a swing style, was intended for a sequence where the group journeys to the Witch's castle. Owing to time constraints, it was cut from the final theatrical version. The film footage of the song has been lost, although silent 8mm color home-film footage of the rehearsals has survived. The audio recording of the song was preserved, and was included in the 1995 Rhino Records two-CD deluxe edition of the soundtrack, as well as on the film's VHS and DVD editions. A reference to "The Jitterbug" remains in the film: The Witch tells her flying monkeys that they should have no trouble apprehending Dorothy and her friends because "I've sent a little insect on ahead to take the fight out of them."

Another musical number cut before release came right after the Wicked Witch of the West was melted and before Dorothy and her friends returned to the Wizard. This was a reprise of "Ding-Dong! The Witch Is Dead" (blended with "We're Off to See the Wizard" and "The Merry Old Land of Oz") with the lyrics altered to "Hail! Hail! The witch is dead!" This started with the Witch's guard saying "Hail to Dorothy! The Wicked Witch is dead!" and dissolved to a huge celebration by the citizens of the Emerald City, who sang the song as they accompanied Dorothy and her friends to the Wizard. Today, the film of this scene is also lost, and only a few stills survive, along with a few seconds of footage used on several reissue trailers. The entire audio track was preserved and is included on the two-CD Rhino Record "deluxe" soundtrack edition.

Garland was to sing a brief reprise of "Over the Rainbow" while Dorothy was trapped in the Witch's castle, but it was cut because it was considered too emotionally intense. Because Garland sang the reprise live on set, only the underscoring from the final edit survives. However, the on-set audio of the scene when it was originally filmed under Richard Thorpe still exists and was included as an extra in all home media releases from 1993 onward. The Deluxe Edition soundtrack marries the singing from the Thorpe take to the underscoring from the Fleming version to approximate what this would have sounded like.

=== Underscoring ===
Extensive edits in the film's final cut removed vocals from the last portion of the film. However, the film was fully underscored, with instrumental snippets from the film's various leitmotifs throughout. There was also some recognizable classical and popular music, including:

- Excerpts from Schumann's "The Happy Farmer", at several points early in the film, including the opening scene when Dorothy and Toto hurry home after their encounter with Miss Gulch; when Toto escapes from her; and when the house "rides" the tornado.
- An excerpt of Mendelssohn's Scherzo in E minor, Op. 16, No. 2, when Toto escapes from the Witch's castle.
- An excerpt of Mussorgsky's "Night on Bald Mountain", when Dorothy, the Scarecrow, the Tin Man and the Cowardly Lion try to escape from the Witch's castle.
- "In the Shade of the Old Apple Tree", when Dorothy and the Scarecrow discover the anthropomorphic apple trees.
- "Gaudeamus Igitur", as the Wizard presents awards to the group.
- "Home! Sweet Home!", in part of the closing scene, at Dorothy's house in Kansas.

(This list is excerpted from the liner notes of the Rhino Records collection.)

== Post-production ==
Principal photography concluded with the monochromatic Kansas sequences on March 16, 1939. When Victor Fleming was called away to replace George Cukor as director of Gone with the Wind, veteran director King Vidor agreed to direct Oz during its final ten days of principal production. This included the bulk of the Kansas scenes, including Garland's performance of "Over the Rainbow".

Reshoots and pickup shots were done through April and May and into June, under the direction of producer LeRoy. When the "Over the Rainbow" reprise was removed after subsequent test screenings in early June, Garland had to be brought back to reshoot the "Auntie Em, I'm frightened!" scene without the song. The footage of Blandick's Aunt Em, as shot by Vidor, had already been set aside for rear-projection work, and was reused.

After Hamilton's severe injuries with the Munchkinland elevator, she refused to do the pickups for the scene where she flies on a broomstick that billows smoke, so LeRoy had stunt double Betty Danko perform instead. Danko was severely injured when the smoke mechanism malfunctioned.

At this point, the film began a long, arduous post-production. Herbert Stothart composed the film's background score, while A. Arnold Gillespie perfected the special effects, including many of the rear-projection shots. The MGM art department created matte paintings for many scene backgrounds.

A significant innovation planned for the film was the use of stencil printing for the transition to Technicolor. Each frame was to be hand-tinted to maintain the sepia tone. However, it was abandoned because it was too expensive and labor-intensive, and MGM used a simpler, less expensive technique: During the May reshoots, the inside of the farmhouse was painted sepia, and when Dorothy opens the door, it is not Garland, but her stand-in, Bobbie Koshay, wearing a sepia gingham dress, who then backs out of frame. Once the camera moves through the door, Garland steps back into frame in her bright blue gingham dress (as noted in DVD extras), and the sepia-painted door briefly tints her with the same color before she emerges from the house's shadow, into the bright glare of the Technicolor lighting. This also meant that the reshoots provided the first proper shot of Munchkinland. Test screenings of the film began on June 5, 1939. Oz initially ran nearly two hours long. In 1939, the average film ran for about 90 minutes. LeRoy and Fleming knew they needed to cut at least 15 minutes to get the film down to a manageable running time. Three sneak previews in San Bernardino, Pomona and San Luis Obispo, California, guided LeRoy and Fleming in the cutting. Among the many cuts were "The Jitterbug" number, the Scarecrow's elaborate Busby Berkeley-directed dance sequence following "If I Only Had a Brain", reprises of "Over the Rainbow" and "Ding-Dong! The Witch Is Dead", and a number of smaller dialogue sequences. This left the final, mostly serious portion of the film with no songs, only the dramatic underscoring.

"Over the Rainbow" was almost deleted. MGM felt that it made the Kansas sequence too long, as well as being far over the heads of the target audience of children. The studio also thought that it was degrading for Garland to sing in a barnyard. LeRoy, uncredited associate producer Arthur Freed and director Fleming fought to keep it in, and they eventually won. The song went on to win the Academy Award for Best Original Song, and came to be identified so strongly with Garland herself that she made it her signature song.

After the preview in San Luis Obispo in early July, the film was officially released in August 1939 at its current 101-minute running time.

== Release ==
=== Original theatrical run ===
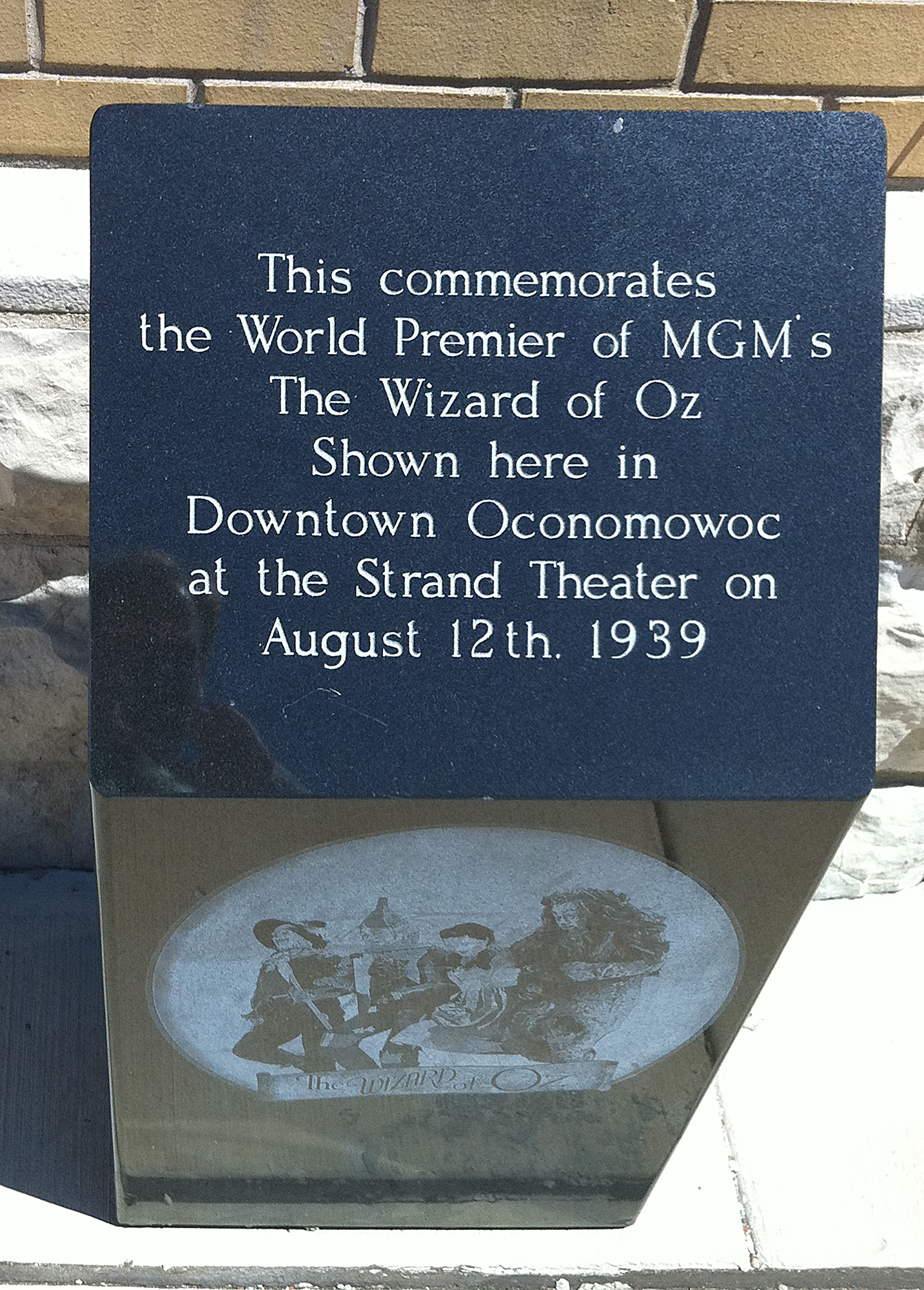
A memorial which incorrectly attributes the film's world premiere to the Strand Theatre in Oconomowoc, Wisconsin, on August 12, 1939

The film premiered at the Orpheum Theatre in Green Bay, Wisconsin, on August 10, 1939, although this is disputed by the August 23, 1939, issue of "The Exhibitor", which places the debut a day earlier in New Bedford, Massachusetts. The first sneak preview was held in San Bernardino, California. The film was previewed in three test markets: Kenosha, Wisconsin, on August 11, 1939; Dennis, Massachusetts, also on August 11; and the Strand Theatre in Oconomowoc, Wisconsin, on August 12.

The Hollywood premiere was on August 15, 1939, at Grauman's Chinese Theatre. The New York City premiere, held at Loew's Capitol Theatre on August 17, 1939, was followed by a live performance with Garland and her frequent film co-star Mickey Rooney. They continued to perform there after each screening for a week. Garland extended her appearance for two more weeks, partnered with Rooney for a second week and with Oz co-stars Ray Bolger and Bert Lahr for the third and final week. The film opened nationwide on August 25, 1939.

=== Television ===
MGM sold CBS the rights to televise the film for $225,000 (equivalent to $2.04 million in 2025) per broadcast. It was first shown on television on November 3, 1956, as the last installment of the Ford Star Jubilee. It was a ratings success, with a Nielsen rating of 33.9 and an audience share of 53%.

It was repeated on December 13, 1959, and gained an even larger television audience, with a Nielsen rating of 36.5 and an audience share of 58%. It became an annual television tradition.

The UK television premiere was on Christmas Day, 1975, on BBC1. The estimated UK television audience was 20 million.

=== Home media ===
On October 25, 1980, the film was released on videocassette (in both VHS and Betamax format) by MGM/CBS Home Video. On September 10, 1996, a THX certified VHS release would debut. All current home video releases are by Warner Home Video (via current rights holder Turner Entertainment).

The film's first LaserDisc release was in 1983. In 1989, there were two releases for the 50th anniversary, one from Turner and one from The Criterion Collection, with a commentary track. LaserDiscs came out in 1991 and 1993, and the final LaserDisc was released September 11, 1996.

The film was released on the CED format once, in 1982, by MGM/UA Home Video. It has also been released multiple times outside of the North American and European markets, in Asia, in the Video CD format.

The first DVD release was on March 26, 1997, by MGM/UA Home Video. It contained no special features or supplements. On October 19, 1999, The Wizard of Oz was re-released by Warner Home Video to celebrate the film's 60th anniversary, with its soundtrack presented in a new 5.1 surround sound mix. The DVD also contained a behind-the-scenes documentary, The Wonderful Wizard of Oz: The Making of a Movie Classic, produced in 1990 and hosted by Angela Lansbury, which was originally shown on television immediately following the 1990 telecast of the film. It had been featured in the 1993 "Ultimate Oz" LaserDisc release. Outtakes, the deleted "Jitterbug" musical number, clips of pre-1939 Oz adaptations, trailers, newsreels, and a portrait gallery were also included, as well as two radio programs of the era publicizing the film.

In 2005, two DVD editions were released, both featuring a newly restored version of the film with an audio commentary and an isolated music and effects track. One of the two DVD releases was a "Two-Disc Special Edition", featuring production documentaries, trailers, outtakes, newsreels, radio shows and still galleries. The other set, a "Three-Disc Collector's Edition", included these features, as well as the digitally restored 80th-anniversary edition of the 1925 feature-length silent film version of The Wizard of Oz, other silent Oz adaptations and a 1933 animated short version.

The film was released on Blu-ray on September 29, 2009, for its 70th anniversary, in a four-disc "Ultimate Collector's Edition", including all the bonus features from the 2005 Collector's Edition DVD, new bonus features about Victor Fleming and the surviving Munchkins, the telefilm The Dreamer of Oz: The L. Frank Baum Story, and the miniseries MGM: When the Lion Roars. For this edition, Warner Bros. (through Motion Picture Imaging) commissioned a new transfer from the original nitrate Technicolor negatives at 8K resolution. The restoration job was given to Prime Focus World. This restored version also features a lossless 5.1 Dolby TrueHD audio track.

On December 1, 2009, three Blu-ray discs of the Ultimate Collector's Edition were repackaged as a less expensive "Emerald Edition". An Emerald Edition four-disc DVD arrived the following week. A single-disc Blu-ray, containing the restored movie and all the extra features of the two-disc Special Edition DVD, became available on March 16, 2010.

In 2013, the film was re-released on DVD, Blu-ray, Blu-ray 3D and UltraViolet for the 90th anniversary of Warner Bros. and the 75th anniversary of the film.

Many special editions were released in 2013 in celebration of the film's 75th anniversary, including one exclusively by Best Buy (a SteelBook of the 3D Blu-ray) and another by Target stores that came with a keepsake lunch bag.

The film was issued on 4K Ultra HD Blu-ray on October 29, 2019, featuring both a Dolby Vision and an HDR10+ grading from an 8K transfer. Another 4K Ultra HD Blu-ray release, including collective replica items from the film's Hollywood premiere was released on November 5, 2024, to celebrate the film's 85th anniversary.

=== Re-releases ===
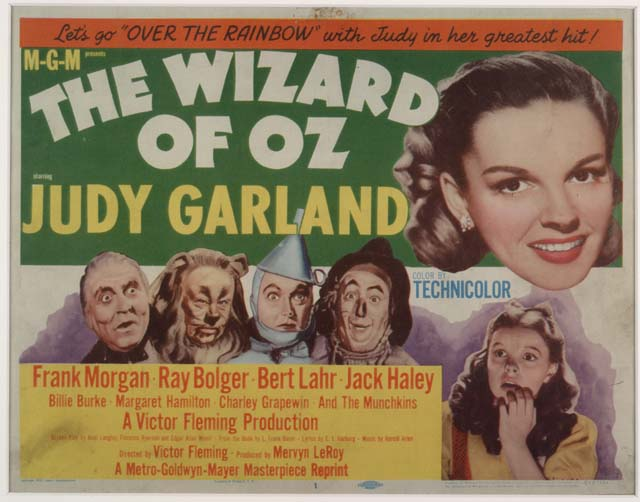
This lobby card for the 1955 re-release carried a contemporary image of Garland.

Although the 1949 re-issue used sepia tone, the 1955 re-issue showed the Kansas sequences in black and white instead, a practice that continued on television broadcasts and home releases until the 50th anniversary VHS release in 1989.

The MGM "Children's Matinees" series re-released the film twice, in both 1970 and 1971. It was for this release that the film received a G rating from the MPAA.

For the film's 60th anniversary, Warner Bros. released a "Special Edition" on November 6, 1998, digitally restored with remastered audio.

In 2002, the film had a very limited re-release in U.S. theaters, earning only $139,905.

On September 23, 2009, the film was re-released in select theaters for a one-night-only event in honor of its 70th anniversary and as a promotion for various new disc releases later in the month. An encore of this event took place in theaters on November 17, 2009.

Poster for the 2013 IMAX 3D re-release, as part of the film's 75th anniversary

An IMAX 3D theatrical re-release played at 300 theaters in North America for one week only beginning September 20, 2013, as part of the film's 75th anniversary. Warner Bros. spent $25 million on advertising. The studio hosted a premiere of the film's first IMAX 3D release on September 15, 2013, in Hollywood at the newly remodeled TCL Chinese Theatre (formerly Grauman's Chinese Theatre, the site of the film's Hollywood premiere). It was the first motion picture to play at the new theater and served as the grand opening of Hollywood's first 3D IMAX screen. It was also shown as a special presentation at the 2013 Toronto International Film Festival. This re-release grossed $5.6 million at the North American box office.

In 2013, in preparation for its IMAX 3D release, the film was submitted to the MPAA for re-classification. According to MPAA rules, a film that has been altered in any way from its original version must be submitted for re-classification, and the 3-D conversion fell within that guideline. The 3D version received a PG rating for "Some scary moments", although no change was made to the film's original story content. The 2D version still retains its G rating.

The film was re-released on January 11 and 14, 2015, as part of the "TCM Presents" series by Turner Classic Movies.

The film was re-released by Fathom Events through "TCM Big Screen Classics" on January 27, 29, 30, 2019, and February 3 and 5, 2019, as part of its 80th anniversary. It also had a one-week theatrical engagement in Dolby Cinema on October 25, 2019, to commemorate the anniversary.

The film returned to theaters on June 5 and 6, 2022, to celebrate Judy Garland's 100th birthday.

To celebrate the 85th anniversary, "Fathom Big Screen Classics" (now taken over from TCM) released the film January 28, 29 and 31, 2024, with a special introduction by Leonard Maltin and a preshow trivia game hosted by "Oz Vlog" host Victoria Calamito.

==== The Wizard of Oz at Sphere ====
An "immersive" 75-minute version of the film began screening at Sphere in the Las Vegas Valley on August 28, 2025. It was produced by Sphere Entertainment and Jane Rosenthal in collaboration with Google, Warner Bros., and VFX studio Magnopus. Artificial intelligence provided by Google AI was used to upscale the video resolution for the venue's 16K resolution screen and, using the Veo 2 and Imagen 3 Gemini models, generate additional imagery to expand shots beyond what was originally in frame. An estimated 1.2 petabytes of data were processed for the project. Live multi-sensory effects such as flashing lights, haptics, wind, fog and scents are employed during screenings of the film. Jennifer Lame served as editor, along with Ben Grossmann as visual effects specialist, Paul Freeman as principal audio artist and Zack Winokur as creative director. The film's soundtrack was also remastered to fit the Sphere's immersive sound system, in addition to having the entire score re-recorded with an 80-piece orchestra under the direction of David Newman, on the same scoring stage where it was originally recorded. The project has had a mixed reception. A soundtrack of this version of the film was released on November 7, 2025, with an a cappella version of "Over the Rainbow" sung by Judy Garland.

== Reception ==
=== Critical response ===
The Wizard of Oz received universal acclaim upon its release. Writing for The New York Times, Frank Nugent considered the film a "delightful piece of wonder-working which had the youngsters' eyes shining and brought a quietly amused gleam to the wiser ones of the oldsters. Not since Disney's Snow White and the Seven Dwarfs has anything quite so fantastic succeeded half so well." Nugent had issues with some of the film's special effects:

with the best of will and ingenuity, they cannot make a Munchkin or a Flying Monkey that will not still suggest, however vaguely, a Singer's Midget in a Jack Dawn masquerade. Nor can they, without a few betraying jolts and split-screen overlappings, bring down from the sky the great soap bubble in which Glinda rides and roll it smoothly into place.

According to Nugent, "Judy Garland's Dorothy is a pert and fresh-faced miss with the wonder-lit eyes of a believer in fairy tales, but the Baum fantasy is at its best when the Scarecrow, the Tin Man, and the Lion are on the move."

Writing in Variety, John C. Flinn predicted that the film was "likely to perform some record-breaking feats of box-office magic", noting, "Some of the scenic passages are so beautiful in design and composition as to stir audiences by their sheer unfoldment." He also called Garland "an appealing figure" and the musical numbers "gay and bright".

Harrison's Reports wrote, "Even though some persons are not interested in pictures of this type, it is possible that they will be eager to see this picture just for its technical treatment. The performances are good, and the incidental music is of considerable aid. Pictures of this caliber bring credit to the industry."

Film Daily wrote:

Leo the Lion is privileged to herald this one with his deepest roar—the one that comes from way down—for seldom if indeed ever has the screen been so successful in its approach to fantasy and extravaganza through flesh-and-blood ... handsomely mounted fairy story in Technicolor, with its wealth of humor and homespun philosophy, its stimulus to the imagination, its procession of unforgettable settings, its studding of merry tunes should click solidly at the box-office.

Some reviews were less positive. Some moviegoers felt that the 16-year-old Garland was slightly too old to play the little girl who Baum intended his Dorothy to be. Russell Maloney of The New Yorker wrote that the film displayed "no trace of imagination, good taste, or ingenuity" and declared it "a stinkeroo", while Otis Ferguson of The New Republic wrote: "It has dwarfs, music, Technicolor, freak characters, and Judy Garland. It can't be expected to have a sense of humor, as well – and as for the light touch of fantasy, it weighs like a pound of fruitcake soaking wet." Still, the film placed seventh on Film Daily's year-end nationwide poll of 542 critics naming the best films of the year.

=== Box office ===
According to MGM records, during the film's initial release, it earned $2,048,000 in the U.S. and $969,000 in other countries throughout the world, for total earnings of $3,017,000. However, its high production cost, plus the costs of marketing, distribution, and other services, resulted in it not being a financial success during its initial release and a loss of $1,145,000 for the studio. It would not break even until its 1949 re-release, which earned it an additional $1.5 million (about $16 million in 2025). Christopher Finch, author of the Judy Garland biography Rainbow: The Stormy Life of Judy Garland, wrote: "Fantasy is always a risk at the box office. The film had been enormously successful as a book, and it had also been a major stage hit, but previous attempts to bring it to the screen had been dismal failures." He also wrote that after the film proved to be popular, Garland signed a new contract with MGM giving her a substantial increase in salary, making her one of the top ten box-office stars in the United States.

The film was also re-released domestically in 1955. Subsequent re-releases between 1989 and 2019 have grossed $25,173,032 worldwide, for a total worldwide gross of $29,690,032.

=== Legacy ===
The film was not the first to use color, but the way in which the film was saturated with Technicolor proved that color could provide a magical element to fantasy films. The film is iconic for its symbols such as the Yellow Brick Road, ruby slippers, Emerald City, Munchkins, and the phrase "There's no place like home". The film became a global phenomenon and is still well known today.

Roger Ebert included it in his canon of Great Movies, writing that "The Wizard of Oz has a wonderful surface of comedy and music, special effects and excitement, but we still watch it six decades later because its underlying story penetrates straight to the deepest insecurities of childhood, stirs them and then reassures them."

In his 1992 appreciation of the film for the British Film Institute, author Salman Rushdie acknowledged its effect on him, noting "The Wizard of Oz was my very first literary influence". In Step Across This Line, he wrote: "When I first saw The Wizard of Oz, it made a writer of me." His first short story, written at the age of 10, was titled "Over the Rainbow". It was the favorite film of David Lynch, who referenced it regularly in his own work. The references Lynch made to it are explored in Alexandre O. Philippe's documentary Lynch/Oz (2022).

In a 2009 retrospective article about the film, San Francisco Chronicle film critic and author Mick LaSalle declared:

... the entire Munchkinland sequence, from Dorothy's arrival in Oz to her departure on the yellow brick road, has to be one of the greatest in cinema history – a masterpiece of set design, costuming, choreography, music, lyrics, storytelling, and sheer imagination.

In 2018, it was named the "most influential film of all time" as the result of a study conducted by the University of Turin to measure the success and significance of 47,000 films from around the world using data from readers and audience polls, as well as internet sources such as IMDb. It would top the list in their study, followed by the Star Wars franchise, Psycho (1960), King Kong (1933) and 2001: A Space Odyssey (1968) rounding out the top 5. Variety published an article in 2025 about The Wizard of Oz's long term relevance. Writer Owen Blackwood believes that this is a result of it being an early depiction of a Hollywood film questioning traditional patriarchy. He noted that while the Wizard was the most "powerful figure in the kingdom", his influence is an illusion, and contrasted that with Glinda and the Wicked Witch being the only people with true abilities.

On the film review aggregator site Rotten Tomatoes, The Wizard of Oz has a 98% rating based on 171 reviews, with an average score of 9.7/10. Its critical consensus reads, "An absolute masterpiece whose groundbreaking visuals and deft storytelling are still every bit as resonant, The Wizard of Oz is a must-see film for young and old." At Metacritic, which assigns a normalized rating to reviews, the film received a score of 92 out of 100, based on 30 reviews, indicating "universal acclaim".

The film was included by the Vatican in a list of important films compiled in 1995, under the category of "Art".

Many notable people in the world of entertainment have voiced their admiration for the film and its influence on their work over the years, including filmmakers James Cameron, Jon M. Chu, Greta Gerwig, Jim Henson, Ron Howard, George Lucas, Oz Perkins, Steven Spielberg, Ant Timpson, John Waters and Michael Williams, actors Josh Gad, Cailee Spaeny and Michelle Yeoh, and musician Alex Turner of the Arctic Monkeys.

== Accolades ==
=== Academy Awards ===
Award	Date of ceremony	Category	Nominee(s)	Result	Ref.
Academy Awards	February 29, 1940	Outstanding Production	Metro-Goldwyn-Mayer	Nominated	
Academy Awards	February 29, 1940	Best Art Direction	Cedric Gibbons and William A. Horning	Nominated	
Academy Awards	February 29, 1940	Best Original Score	Herbert Stothart	Won	
Academy Awards	February 29, 1940	Best Original Song	"Over the Rainbow"; Music by Harold Arlen; Lyrics by E. Y. Harburg	Won	
Academy Awards	February 29, 1940	Best Special Effects	A. Arnold Gillespie and Douglas Shearer	Nominated	
Academy Awards	February 29, 1940	Academy Juvenile Award	Judy Garland; For her outstanding performance as a screen juvenile during the past year. (She was jointly awarded for her performances in Babes in Arms and The Wizard of Oz).	Honorary	

=== American Film Institute lists ===
The American Film Institute (AFI) has compiled various lists which include this film or its elements.

- AFI's 100 Years...100 Movies – No. 6
- AFI's 100 Years...100 Thrills – No. 43
- AFI's 100 Years...100 Heroes & Villains:
  - Wicked Witch of the West – No. 4 Villain
- AFI's 100 Years...100 Songs:
  - "Over the Rainbow" – No. 1
  - "Ding-Dong! The Witch Is Dead" – No. 82
- AFI's 100 Years...100 Movie Quotes:
  - "Toto, I've a feeling we're not in Kansas anymore." (Dorothy Gale) – No. 4
  - "There's no place like home." (Dorothy) – No. 23
  - "I'll get you, my pretty – and your little dog, too!" (Wicked Witch of the West) – No. 99
- AFI's Greatest Movie Musicals – No. 3
- AFI's 100 Years...100 Cheers – No. 26
- AFI's 100 Years...100 Movies (10th Anniversary Edition) – No. 10
- AFI's 10 Top 10 – No. 1 Fantasy film

=== Other honors ===
- 1989: The film was one of the inaugural group of 25 films added to the National Film Registry list.
- 1999: Rolling Stone's 100 Maverick Movies – No. 20.
- 1999: Entertainment Weekly's 100 Greatest Films – No. 32.
- 2000: The Village Voice's 100 Best Films of the 20th Century – No. 14.
- 2002: Nominated – 1939 Palme d'Or
- 2002: Sight & Sound's Greatest Film Poll of Directors – No. 41.
- 2005: Total Film's 100 Greatest Films – No. 83
- 2005: The British Film Institute ranked it second on its list of the 50 films you should see by the age of 14, after Spirited Away.
- 2006: The film placed 86th on Bravo's 100 Scariest Movie Moments.
- 2006: The Writers Guild of America West ranked its screenplay 25th in WGA's list of 101 Greatest Screenplays.
- 2007: It topped Total Film's 23 Weirdest Films.
- 2007: The film was listed on UNESCO's Memory of the World international register.
- 2007: The Observer ranked the film's songs and music at the top of its list of 50 greatest film soundtracks.
- 2020: The British Film Institute changed its list to "50 films to see by age 15 – Updated", calling Oz "The most wonderful of musicals"
- 2020: The Wizard of Oz has been listed annually since this year on New York Magazine's Vulture's list of "The Best Movies That Lost Best Picture at the Oscars".
- 2022: The film was ranked 2nd in Variety's inaugural list of The 100 Greatest Movies of All Time.
- 2023: The film was ranked 5th in Parade's list of The 100 Best Movies of All Time.
- 2023: The film was ranked 4th in Comic Book Resources' list of The Best Movies of All Time.
- 2024: The film was ranked 7th on IndieWire's list of The 63 Best Movie Musicals of All Time.

== Sequels and reinterpretations ==
- The animated Journey Back to Oz, featuring the voice of Judy Garland's daughter Liza Minnelli, was produced to commemorate the original film's 35th anniversary.
- The Wiz, a musical based on the novel, opened in 1974 in Baltimore and in 1975 with a new cast on Broadway. It went on to win seven Tony Awards, including Best Musical. A film adaptation was released in 1978.
- In 1975, a comic book adaptation of the film titled MGM's Marvelous Wizard of Oz was released. It was the first co-production between DC Comics and Marvel Comics. Marvel planned a series of sequels based on the subsequent novels. The first, The Marvelous Land of Oz, was published later that year. The next, The Marvelous Ozma of Oz was expected to be released the following year but never came to be.
- In 1985, Walt Disney Productions released the live-action fantasy film Return to Oz, starring Fairuza Balk in her film debut as a young Dorothy Gale and based on The Marvelous Land of Oz (1904) and Ozma of Oz (1907). With a darker story, it fared poorly with critics unfamiliar with the Oz books and was not successful at the box office, although it has since become a popular cult film, with many considering it a more loyal and faithful adaptation of what L. Frank Baum envisioned.
- The Broadway musical Wicked premiered in 2003, based on the titular novel by Gregory Maguire, which itself re-imagined the 1939 film and Baum's original novel. It has since gone on to become the second highest-grossing Broadway musical of all time, and has won three Tony Awards, seven Drama Desk Awards, and a Grammy Award.
  - The musical was later adapted as a two-part film directed by Jon M. Chu. The first part, Wicked, was released on November 22, 2024, while the second part, Wicked: For Good, was released on November 21, 2025.
- Andrew Lloyd Webber and Tim Rice produced a stage musical of the same name, which opened in 2011 at the West End's London Palladium.
- An animated film called Tom and Jerry and the Wizard of Oz was released in 2011 by Warner Home Video, incorporating Tom and Jerry into the story as Dorothy's "protectors".
  - A sequel titled Tom and Jerry: Back to Oz was released on DVD on June 21, 2016.
- In 2013, Walt Disney Pictures released a "spiritual prequel" titled Oz the Great and Powerful. It was directed by Sam Raimi and starred James Franco, Mila Kunis, Rachel Weisz and Michelle Williams. It was the second film based on Baum's Oz series to be produced by Disney, after Return to Oz. It was a commercial success but received a mixed reception from critics.
- In 2014, independent film company Clarius Entertainment released a big-budget animated musical film, Legends of Oz: Dorothy's Return, which follows Dorothy's second trip to Oz. The film fared poorly at the box office and was received negatively by critics, largely for its plot and unmemorable musical numbers.
- In February 2021, New Line Cinema, Temple Hill Entertainment and Wicked producer Marc Platt announced that a new film version of the original book is in the works with Watchmen's Nicole Kassell slated to direct the reimagining, which will have the option to include elements from the 1939 film.
- In August 2022, it was announced that Kenya Barris would write and direct a modern remake. In January 2024, Barris confirmed that he finished penning the script and remarked "The original Wizard of Oz took place during the Great Depression and it was about self-reliance and what people were going through, I think this is the perfect time to switch the characters and talk about what someone imagines their life could be. It's ultimately a hero's journey, someone thinks something's better than where they're at, and they go and realize that where they're at is where they should be. I want people to be proud and happy about where they're from. But I want the world to take a look at it and I hope that will come through." This involved changing the time period to the present day and changing Dorothy's home from Kansas to the Bottoms of Inglewood, California.
- The 2024 marketing campaign for season 22 of American Idol is directly themed after this film, complete with a commercial featuring Ryan Seacrest and the judges Katy Perry, Lionel Richie and Luke Bryan dressed as Tin Man, Dorothy, Cowardly Lion and Scarecrow following the "Golden Ticket Road" to Hollywood. This was to reflect the show's plans to visit the judges' hometowns throughout the season.

== Cultural impact ==
According to the US Library of Congress exhibition The Wizard of Oz: an American Fairy Tale (2010):

The Wonderful Wizard of Oz is America's greatest and best-loved home-grown fairytale. The first totally American fantasy for children, it is one of the most-read children's books ... Despite its many particularly American attributes, including a wizard from Omaha, [the 1939 film adaptation] has universal appeal... Because of its many television showings between 1956 and 1974, it has been seen by more viewers than any other movie".

In 1977, Aljean Harmetz wrote The Making of The Wizard of Oz, a detailed description of the production of the film based on interviews and archival research. It was reissued in paperback in 1984, and again with a new preface by the author for the film's 50th anniversary in 1989. Another reissue was released, again with a new preface, shortly before the film's theatrical re-release in 1998.

=== Ruby slippers ===
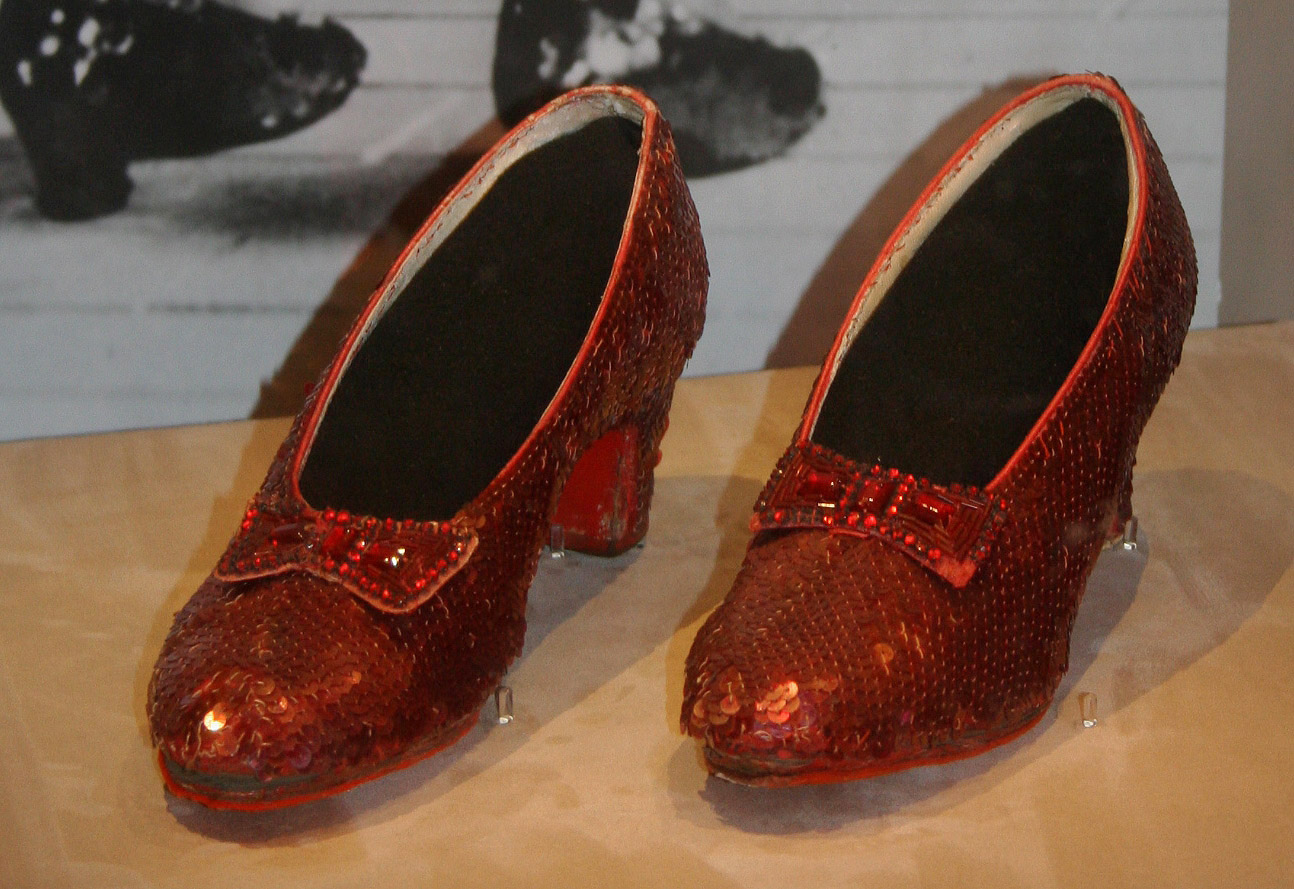
An original pair of the ruby slippers on display at the Smithsonian Institution

Because of their iconic stature, the ruby slippers worn by Judy Garland in the film are now among the most treasured and valuable film memorabilia in movie history. Dorothy actually wore Silver Shoes in the book, but the color was changed to ruby in pre-production by screenwriter Noel Langley to take advantage of the three-strip Technicolor process. Adrian, MGM's chief costume designer, was responsible for the final design. Five known pairs of the slippers exist. Another, differently styled pair, not used in the film, was sold at auction by actress Debbie Reynolds for $510,000 (not including the buyer's premium) in June 2011. One pair of Judy Garland's ruby slippers are located in Washington D.C. at the Smithsonian National Museum of American History.

In 2005, one of the pairs of the ruby slippers was stolen while on loan to the Judy Garland Museum in Garland's hometown. They were recovered in an FBI sting operation in 2018. In 2023, Terry Jon Martin pleaded guilty to stealing the slippers, but he was not sentenced to prison because he was in hospice care and had less than a year to live. At the time they were stolen, the slippers were insured for $1 million. In December 2024, they were sold at auction for over $32 million, more than $26 million above the previous highest price ever paid for a piece of entertainment memorabilia. The shoes are one of four authentic pairs that are still intact.

=== Dorothy's dress and other costumes ===
In July 2021, Catholic University of America reported that a dress worn by Dorothy, believed to have been given to Rev. Gilbert Hartke by Mercedes McCambridge as a gift in 1973, was found in the university's Hartke Building after being missing for many years. The university said an expert on the movie's memorabilia at the Smithsonian's National Museum of American History said five other dresses apparently worn by Judy Garland were "probably authentic". The dress found at the university had characteristics shared by the other five, including a "secret pocket" for Dorothy's handkerchief, and Garland's name written in a specific style. The university said the dress would be stored in Special Collections.

Another of the dresses sold at auction in 2015 for nearly $1.6 million, and one of the witch hats worn by Hamilton went for $2.93 million in 2024. Many other costumes have fetched six-figure prices as memorabilia. See List of film memorabilia.

=== Theme park attractions ===
The Wizard of Oz had a presence at the Disney Parks and Resorts. The film had its own scene at The Great Movie Ride at Disney Hollywood Studios at Walt Disney World Resort, and was also represented in miniature at Disneyland and at Disneyland Paris as part of the Storybook Land Canal Boats attraction in Fantasyland before being replaced by Up in 2024. The Great Movie Ride was shut down in 2017.

On July 20, 2022, it was announced that Warner Bros. Movie World would be adding a new precinct based on the 1939 film The Wizard Of Oz. It features two coasters manufactured by Vekoma. It opened in 2024.

== See also ==
- The Dark Side of the Rainbow
- Friend of Dorothy
- List of cult films
- List of films about witchcraft
- Political interpretations of The Wonderful Wizard of Oz
- Wizard of Oz festival
- The Wiz (musical)
- The Wiz (film)
- Return to Oz
- The Wizard of Oz in Concert: Dreams Come True

== Bibliography ==
- Aylesworth, Thomas (1984). History of Movie Musicals. New York City: Gallery Books. ISBN 978-0-8317-4467-0.
- Clarke, Gerald (2001). Get Happy: The Life of Judy Garland. New York: Random House. ISBN 978-0-375-50378-8.
- Cox, Stephen (1996). The Munchkins of Oz. Cumberland House. ISBN 978-1-58182-269-4.
- Fricke, John (1989). The Wizard of Oz: The Official 50th Anniversary Pictorial History. New York: Warner Books. ISBN 978-0-446-51446-0.
- Fricke, John; Scarfone, Jay; Stillman, William (1989). The Wizard of Oz: The Official 50th Anniversary Pictorial History. New York, NY: Warner Books, Inc. ISBN 978-0-446-51446-0.
- Fordin, Hugh (1996) [1975]. M-G-M's Greatest Musicals: The Arthur Freed Unit. New York: Da Capo Press. ISBN 978-0-306-80730-5.
- Green, Stanley (1990). Hollywood Musicals Year by Year (2nd ed.). Milwaukee, WI: Hal Leonard Corporation. pp. 88–89. ISBN 0-634-00765-3.
- Harmetz, Aljean (1998) [1977]. The Making of the Wizard of Oz: Movie Magic and Studio Power in the Prime of MGM. New York: Hyperion. ISBN 978-0-7868-8352-3.
- Hogan, David J. (2014). The Wizard of Oz FAQ: All That's Left to Know About Life, According to Oz. Hal Leonard Corporation. ISBN 978-1-4803-9719-4.
- Miller, Ron (2006). Special Effects: An Introduction to Movie Magic. Twenty-First Century Books. ISBN 978-0-7613-2918-3.
- Raabe, Meinhardt; Kinske, Daniel (2005). Memories of a Munchkin: An Illustrated Walk Down the Yellow Brick Road. Back Stage Books. ISBN 0-8230-9193-7.
- Scarfone, Jay; Stillman, William (2018). The Road to Oz: The Evolution, Creation, and Legacy of a Motion Picture Masterpiece. Lyons Press. ISBN 978-1-493-03532-8.
- Scarfone, Jay; Stillman, William (2004). The Wizardry of Oz: The Artistry And Magic of the 1939 MGM Classic (Revised and Expanded ed.). New York: Applause Theatre & Cinema Books. ISBN 978-0-517-20333-0.
- Thomas, Rhys (1989). The Ruby Slippers of Oz. Tale Weaver. ISBN 978-0-942139-09-9.
- Burger, Alissa (November 29, 2022). "The Wizard of Oz". Cinema and Media Studies. Oxford University Press. doi:10.1093/OBO/9780199791286-0360. ISBN 978-0-19-979128-6.
