= University of Fashion =

Online fashion lessons library

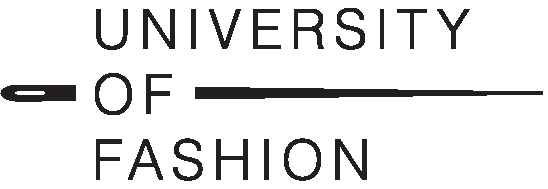
- Owner: Francesca Sterlacci
- Website: universityoffashion.com
- Commercial: Yes
- Registration: Yes
- Launched: 4 July 2013; 13 years ago
- Current status: Online

University of Fashion (also known as UofF) is an online library of fashion design video lessons. The website is owned and operated by Francesca Sterlacci and Jeffrey Purvin and features how-to video lesson tutorials, taught by fashion school professors and industry professionals, teaching the key fashion design disciplines, e.g. draping, patternmaking, sewing, fashion art, knits, childrenswear, CAD, fashion business and fashion product development. It does not provide a graduation degree program. Instead, by subscription, the University of Fashion provides video lessons to those who can't afford or who can't access a traditional fashion school or who want to supplement the learning they're currently receiving from a fashion school.

== Background ==
Sterlacci felt that fashion design was declining in the US due to companies moving off-shore and she wanted to promote fashion design education. She got the idea of launching the University of Fashion while teaching at Fashion Institute of Technology and the Academy of Art University and felt that students "didn't want to rely on books; they wanted videos". In 2013, she launched the website.

Before starting the website, Sterlacci was a professor and chair at the Fashion Institute of Technology and taught graduate-level fashion design at the Academy of Art University. As of the end of 2015, Sterlacci had filmed over 300 video lessons for the website.

== Website ==
The website is owned and operated by Francesca Sterlacci and Jeffrey Purvin, who funded the venture privately. The University of Fashion provides monthly and/or yearly subscriptions to individuals, fashion schools, libraries, sewing clubs, fashion businesses and retailers.

The website features video lessons on draping, patternmaking, sewing, fashion art, knits, children's wear, CAD, fashion business, product development, trend forecasting and colour theory. All lessons are subdivided by the difficulty levels: beginner, intermediate and advanced. The site's lessons feature professors from Fashion Institute of Technology and Parsons The New School for Design as well as other educational institutes, or industry professionals. Aside from its how-to video lessons, the University of Fashion website also provides a fashion terminology dictionary, fashion design tools and supplies, lists of recommended fashion schools, museums, magazines, websites and blogs, as well as tours of fashion museums and features on other fashion venues.

Site visitors can sign up as a Free Member and watch a few free videos or purchase a monthly or yearly subscription to gain unlimited access to all the lessons available on the website. The monthly subscription costs $19.95 and the yearly subscription costs $145. University of Fashion also offers group subscriptions for large organisations, e.g. schools, libraries and fashion clubs.

The Association of Sewing and Design Professionals (ASDP) and several fashion schools use the University of Fashion library as a supplemental resource tool.
