= The Making of The Wizard of Oz =

1977 book written by Aljean Harmetz

- First edition
- Author: Aljean Harmetz
- Language: English
- Publisher: Knopf
- Publication date: 1977
- Media type: Paperback
- Pages: 368
- ISBN: 0-7868-8352-9
- OCLC: 40076566
- Dewey Decimal: 791.43/72 21
- LC Class: PN1997.W593 H3 1998

The Making of the Wizard Of Oz, written by film historian Aljean Harmetz, is a book about the production of the 1939 film The Wizard of Oz. It was the second book published documenting the making of this film, released a year after Doug McClelland's 1976 work Down the Yellow Brick Road.

The book was published in November 1977, after the film had been telecast nineteen times. With 93 photos, it tells readers how the film was made and describes the Golden Era of moviemaking in the 1930s and 1940s at Metro-Goldwyn-Mayer.

The book took two years to create. Aljean Harmetz researched the film and the studio and interviewed the surviving cast, crew and MGM staff. From the acquisition of the music to the scripts, casting, and filming, Harmetz's book provides readers with a detailed re-creation of how the studio produced the film.

It was reissued in paperback in 1984, and again with a new preface by the author for the film's 50th anniversary in 1989. Another reissue was released, again with a new preface, shortly before the film's theatrical re-release in 1998, and a further reissue was planned for the film's 75th anniversary in 2013.

After the success of the book, Aljean Harmetz adapted her knowledge and contacts with the film's survivors into a 30-minute PBS documentary in 1979.
