= Aljean Harmetz =

American journalist and film historian

Aljean Meltsir Harmetz is an American journalist and film historian. She was the Hollywood correspondent for The New York Times from 1978 to 1990.

Her film books include The Making of The Wizard of Oz (1977), a detailed study of the classic 1939 film The Wizard of Oz, and Round Up the Usual Suspects: The Making of Casablanca: Bogart, Bergman, and World War II (1992).

== Early life and education ==
Born Aljean Meltsir Levin, Harmetz grew up in Southern California, near the Metro-Goldwyn-Mayer (MGM) studios. Her mother, Rose Meltzer, worked at MGM's wardrobe department from 1937 to 1951, as an accountant and then the assistant department head. As a teenager, Harmetz held a summer job at MGM working in the fan mail department. During her lunch breaks, she walked around the studio backlot and dreamed of becoming an actress. Harmetz wrote, "I wanted to be a movie star more than anything in the world. The closest I came was when my mother, who worked in the wardrobe department at MGM, got me an audition with director Mervyn LeRoy. I did a splendid Cockney accent. When I was done, he thanked me, and that was that."

Harmetz instead decided to be a writer, and graduated Beverly Hills High School. She then became a Phi Beta Kappa graduate of Stanford University, summa cum laude. While at Stanford, she was a reporter for The Stanford Daily. To strengthen her writing skills, she submitted freelance writing samples to several publications. Her first published work was a poem featured in the Atlantic Monthly, while her third was an article for the Modern Screen magazine. In 1980, she told the Los Angeles Times: "I do not in any way try to hide or turn my back on my fan magazine heritage ... It was an earn-as-you-learn equivalent of the Black Mask (pop mystery) magazines of the '30s for Raymond Chandler and Dashiell Hammett."

== Career ==
By the mid-1950s, Harmetz began working as an entertainment reporter. Intent on protecting their stars' personal lives, a MGM publicist told Harmetz: "No MGM star drinks, smokes, uses bad language, or has sex—even with her husband." In 1978, Harmetz became the Hollywood correspondent of The New York Times, a position she held until 1990. Her journalism, however, has taken criticism. In a 1988 article, Spy magazine characterized Harmetz as possibly "the most inexplicable journalist in Hollywood. If Harmetz writes a story, then it is either (a) wrong, (b) late, (c) trivial or (d) designed to advance the career of one of her sources. Or all of the above."

Since her retirement, Harmetz has written several celebrity obituaries for The New York Times. These include: Mickey Rooney, Lena Horne, Shirley Temple, Billy Wilder, Jack Lemmon, Doris Day, Dina Merrill, and Paul Newman, and Tab Hunter.

=== The Making of The Wizard of Oz ===
In the mid-1970s, Harmetz began writing a book about the production of the 1939 MGM film The Wizard of Oz. She interviewed over fifty surviving cast and crew members from the film, including Ray Bolger, Jack Haley, producer Mervyn LeRoy, writer Noel Langley, songwriter Yip Harburg, and Wicked Witch actress Margaret Hamilton, who became a personal friend.

The book was published by Knopf in 1977, and has never been out of print. It was re-released in 2013 for the 75th anniversary of the film.

In 1979, Harmetz wrote and narrated a television documentary about the making of The Wizard of Oz for KCET titled The Wizardry of Oz. The documentary included filmed interviews with Bolger, Haley, LeRoy, and Margaret Hamilton, and was shown three times nationally on PBS. It was nominated for a local Emmy.

Harmetz hosted a tribute to The Wizard of Oz at the Academy of Motion Picture Arts and Sciences in 1982. The event featured a panel, moderated by Harmetz, of six remaining cast and crew members.

=== Off the Face of the Earth ===
Harmetz’s Off the Face of the Earth is a suspense novel about a boy's abduction and the efforts to free him. It was published by Scribner in 1997 and as a paperbound by Pocket Books in 1998.

The Sunday New York Daily News called the book "a sizzling summertime thriller" and added, "Harmetz spins her tale with taut, wiry prose, and her pages are filled with insight and intrigue. You might have nightmares after reading this book, but you won't regret it."

Publishers Weekly called the book "engrossing," a "tightly controlled, intelligently told, acutely creepy debut thriller." Glamour called it the "best of the beach reads....a terrifying but revealing take on the most universal of horror stories." And The New York Times Book Review said of the book: "well above the classic thriller fare... powerful... psychologically complex... lingers in the mind well after the reader has raced through its pages to the conclusion."

== Accolades ==
Harmetz is a recipient of Yale University's Poynter Fellowship, an award for distinguished journalism.

In 1993, her book The Making of The Wizard of Oz was named by The Book Collectors (Los Angeles) as one of the hundred best books ever written on the movies. It was honored at a reception hosted by the Academy of Motion Picture Arts and Sciences.

== Personal life ==
She married Richard S. Harmetz, and they have three children: Anthony, Daniel, and Elizabeth.

== Published works ==
- "The Way Childbirth Really Is" in Today's Health, February 1972
- The Making of The Wizard of Oz (Knopf, 1977) ISBN 978-0786883523
- Rolling Breaks and Other Movie Business. New York: Random House. 1983. ISBN 978-0394528861.
- Round Up the Usual Suspects: The Making of "Casablanca". New York: Hyperion. 1992. ISBN 978-1562827618.
- On the Road to Tara: The Making of Gone with the Wind. New York: Harry N. Abrams. 1996. ISBN 978-0810936843.
- Off the Face of the Earth. New York: Scribner. 1997. ISBN 978-0684836171.
