= Arrangement =

Musical adaptation of a previous work

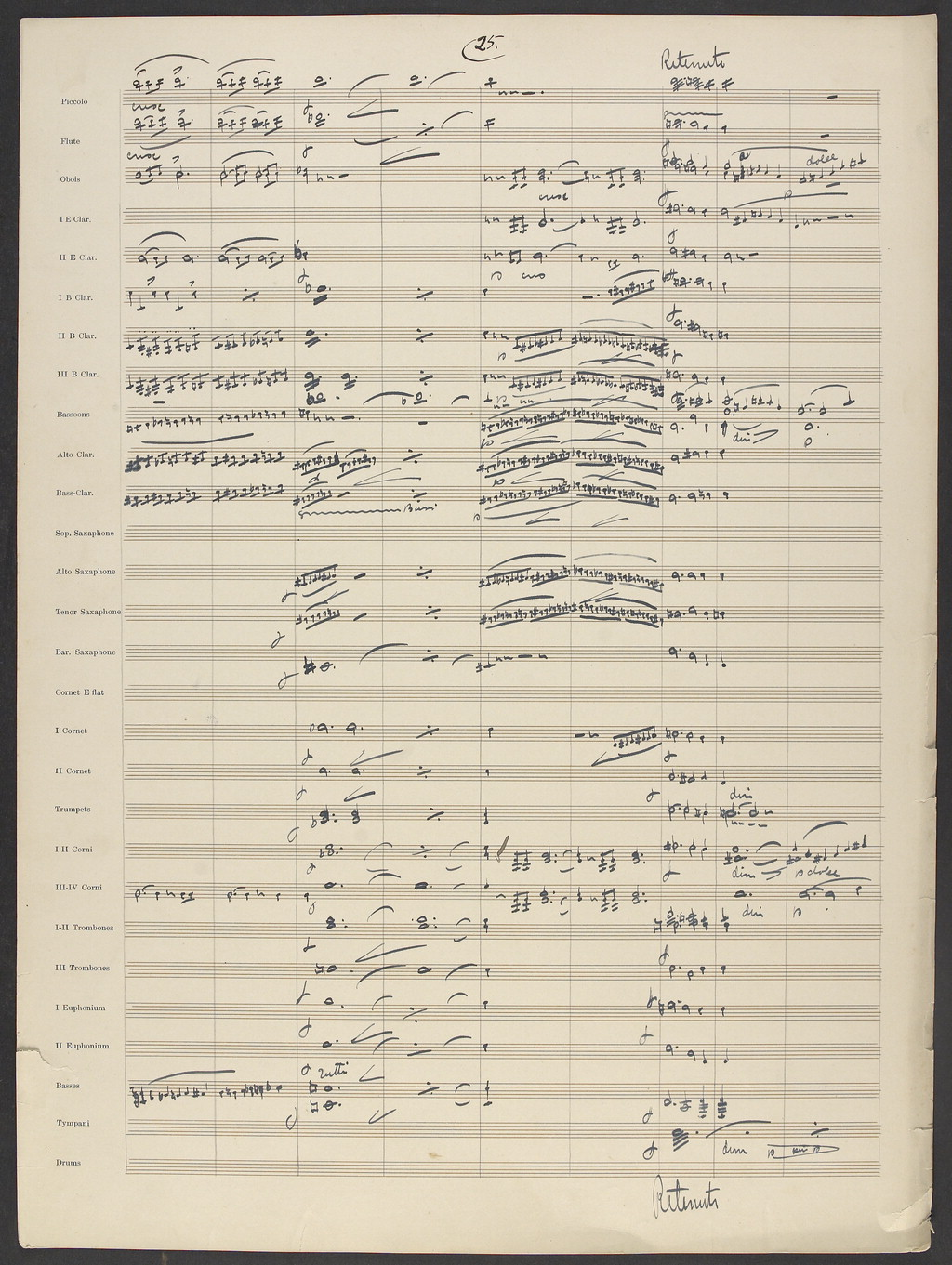
John Philip Sousa's manuscript arrangement of Richard Wagner's The Flying Dutchman overture (page 25 of 37).

In music, an arrangement is a musical adaptation of an existing composition. Differences from the original composition may include reharmonization, melodic paraphrasing, orchestration, or formal development. Arranging differs from orchestration in that the latter process is limited to the assignment of notes to instruments for performance by an orchestra, concert band, or other musical ensemble. Arranging "involves adding compositional techniques, such as new thematic material for introductions, transitions, or modulations, and endings. Arranging is the art of giving an existing melody musical variety". In jazz, a memorized (unwritten) arrangement of a new or pre-existing composition is known as a head arrangement.

== Classical music ==
Arrangement and transcriptions of classical and serious music go back to the early history of classical music.

=== Eighteenth century ===
J. S. Bach frequently made arrangements of his own and other composers' pieces. One example is the arrangement that he made of the Prelude from his Partita No. 3 for solo violin, BWV 1006.

Bach Partita 3 for Violin Prelude

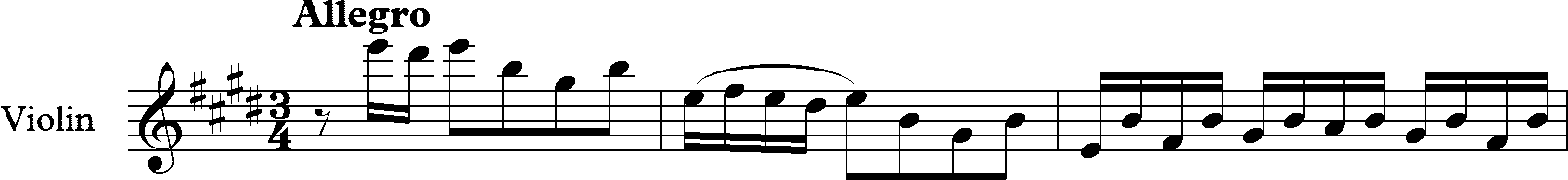
Bach Partita 3 for Violin Prelude

Bach transformed this solo piece into an orchestral Sinfonia that introduces his Cantata BWV29. "The initial violin composition was in E major but both arranged versions are transposed down to D, the better to accommodate the wind instruments".

Bach Cantata 29 Sinfonia

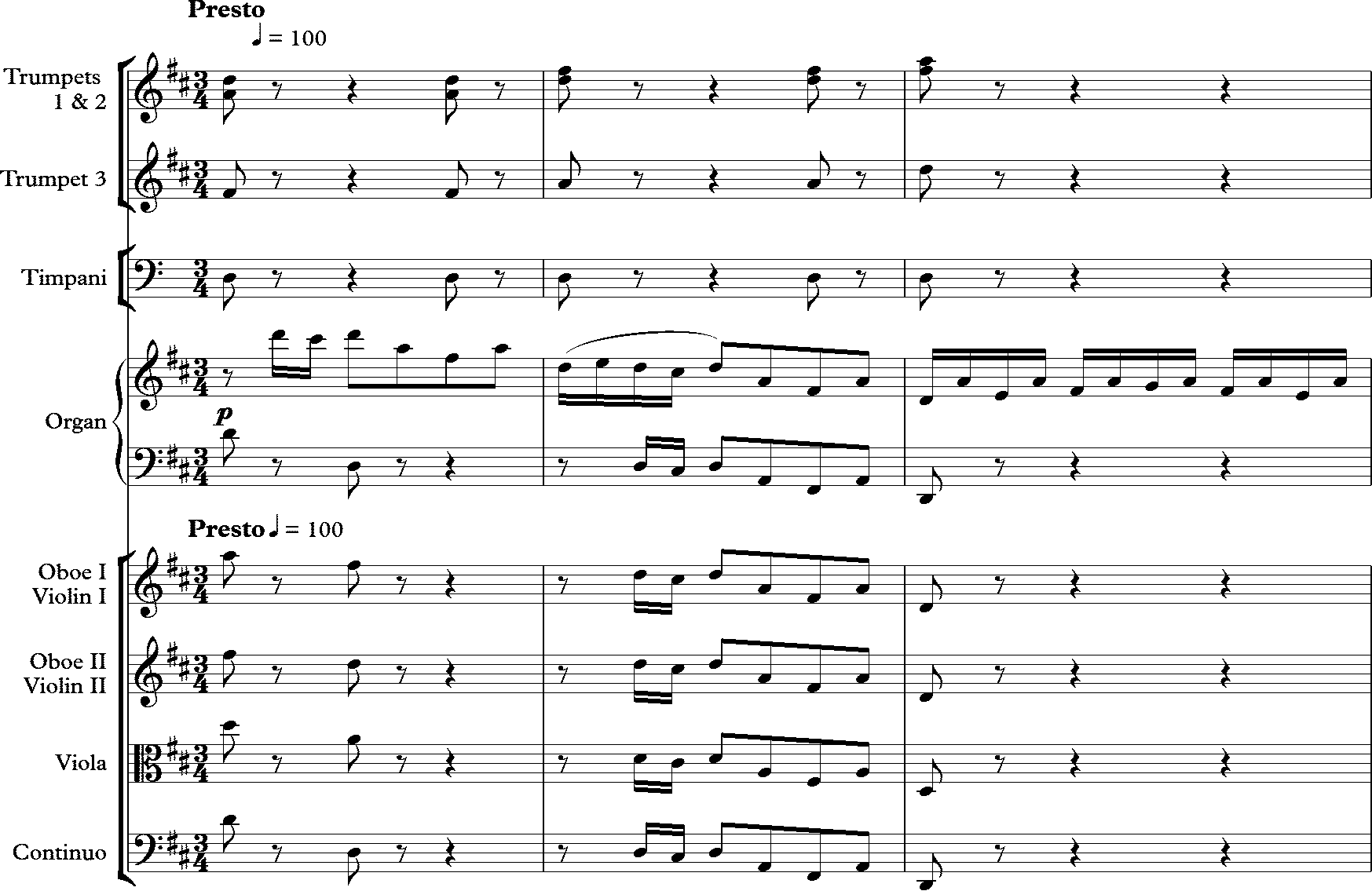
Bach Cantata 29 Sinfonia

"The transformation of material conceived for a single string instrument into a fully orchestrated concerto-type movement is so successful that it is unlikely that anyone hearing the latter for the first time would suspect the existence of the former".

=== Nineteenth and twentieth centuries ===
==== Piano music ====
In particular, music written for the piano has frequently undergone this treatment, as it has been arranged for orchestra, chamber ensemble, or concert band. Beethoven made an arrangement of his Piano Sonata No. 9 for string quartet. Conversely, he also arranged his Grosse Fuge (one of his late string quartets) for piano duet. The American composer George Gershwin, due to his own lack of expertise in orchestration, had his Rhapsody in Blue arranged and orchestrated by Ferde Grofé.

Erik Satie wrote his three Gymnopédies for solo piano in 1888.

Satie Gymnopedie No. 3 for piano solo

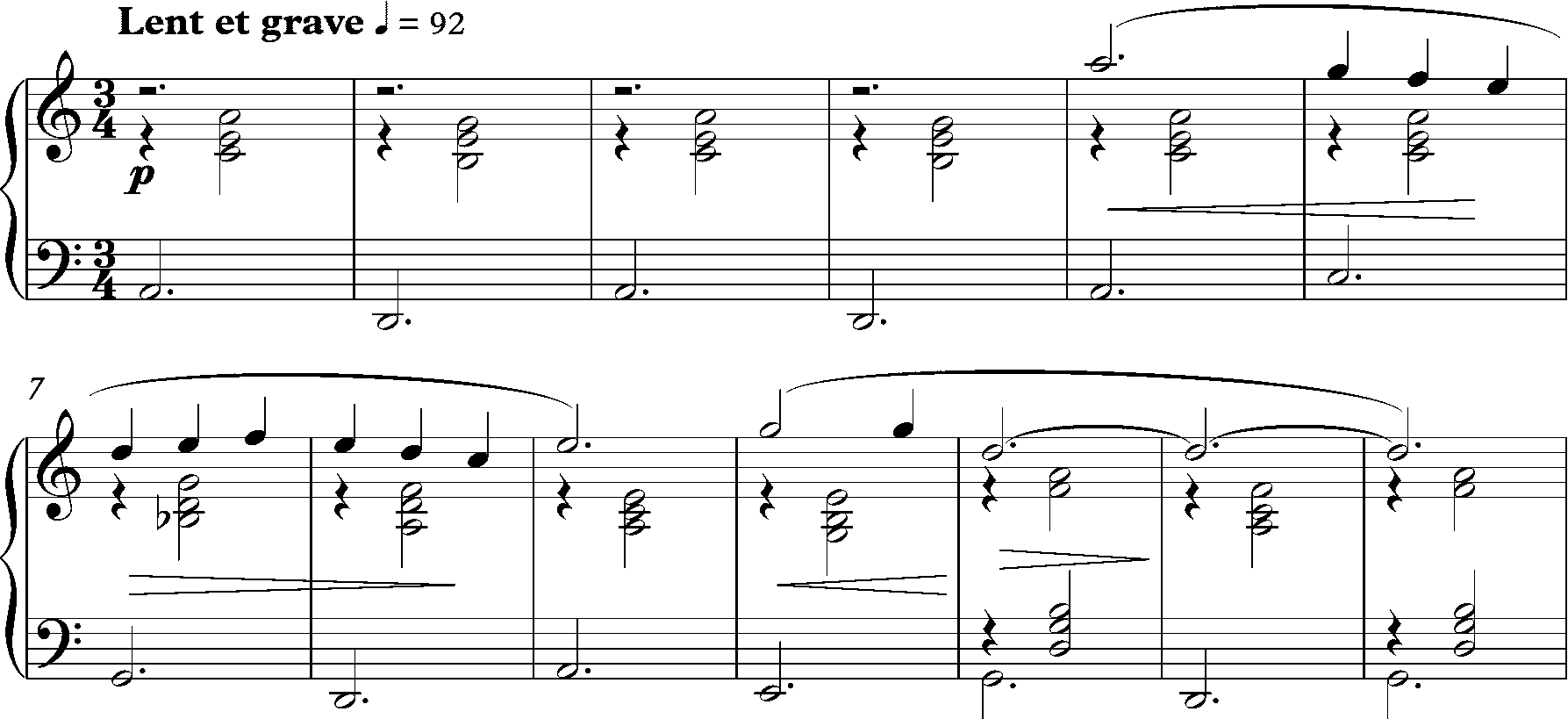
Satie Gymnopedie No. 3 for piano solo

Eight years later, Debussy arranged two of them, exploiting the range of instrumental timbres available in a late 19th-century orchestra. "It was Debussy whose 1896 orchestrations of the Gymnopédies put their composer on the map."

Debussy Gymnopedie 1, arrangement of Satie's Gymnopedie 3.

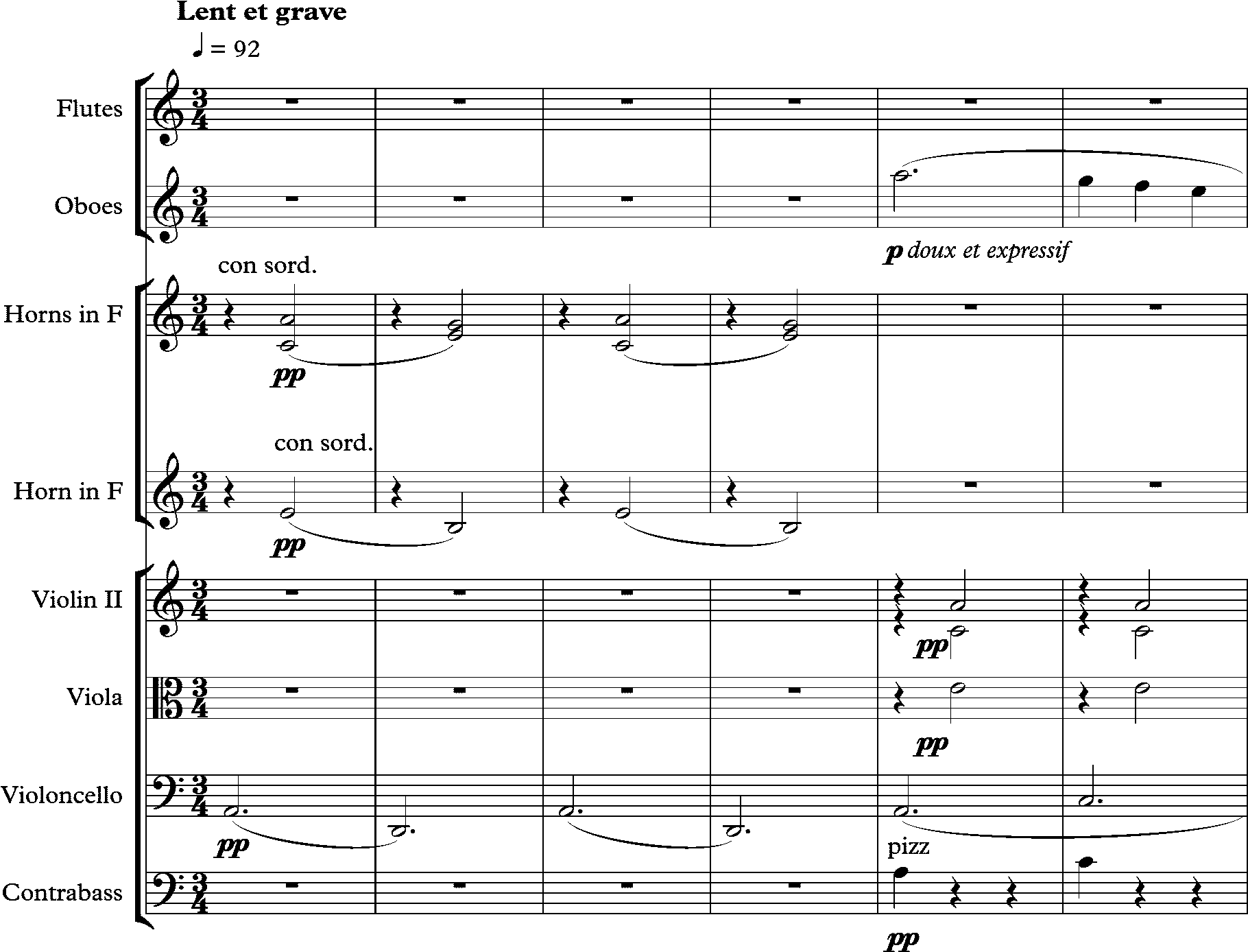

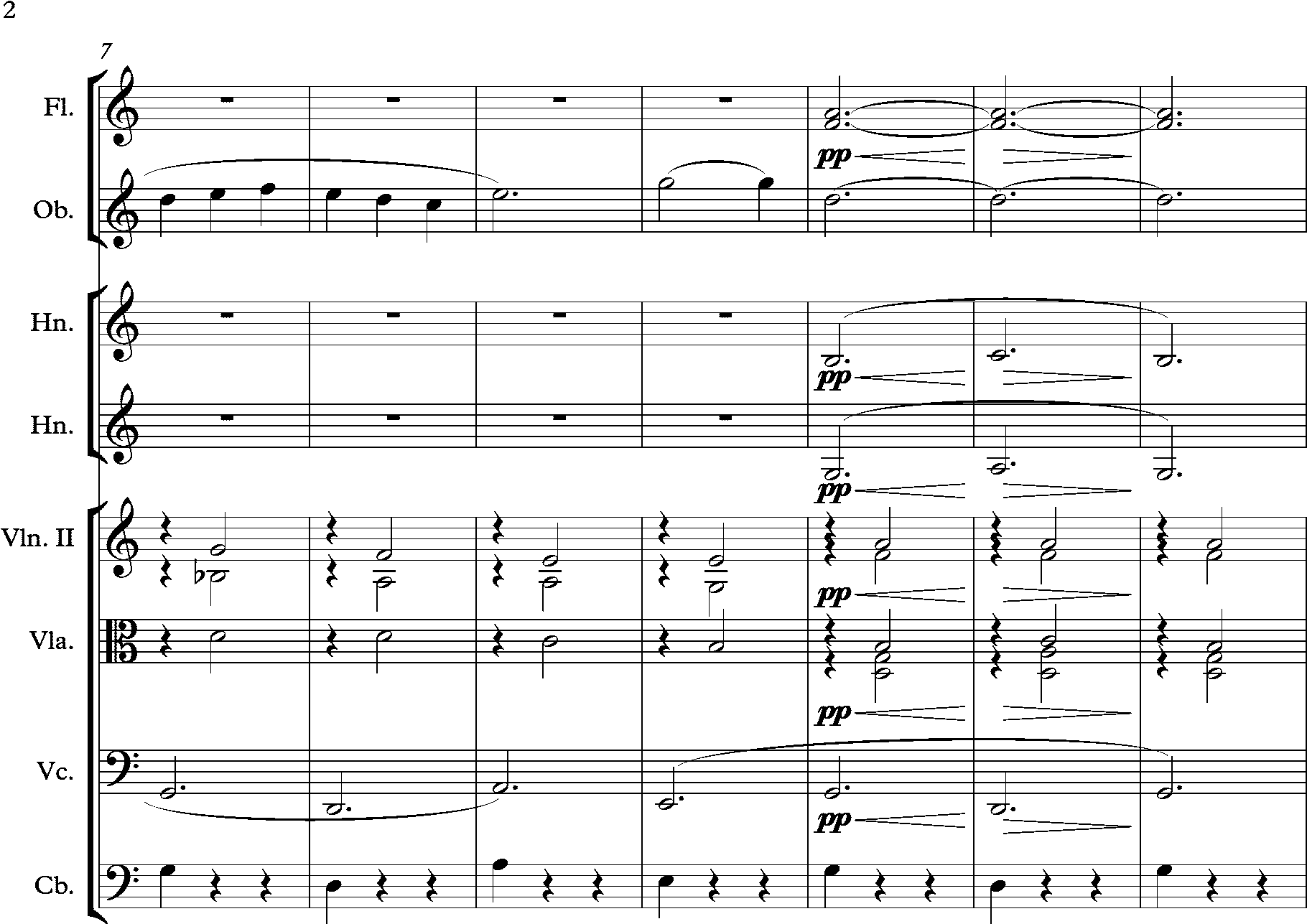
Debussy Gymnopedie 1, arrangement of Satie's Gymnopedie 3

Pictures at an Exhibition, a suite of ten piano pieces by Modest Mussorgsky, has been arranged over twenty times, notably by Maurice Ravel. Ravel's arrangement demonstrates an "ability to create unexpected, memorable orchestral sonorities". In the second movement, "Gnomus", Mussorgsky's original piano piece simply repeats the following passage:

Mussorgsky Gnomus original bars 19-24

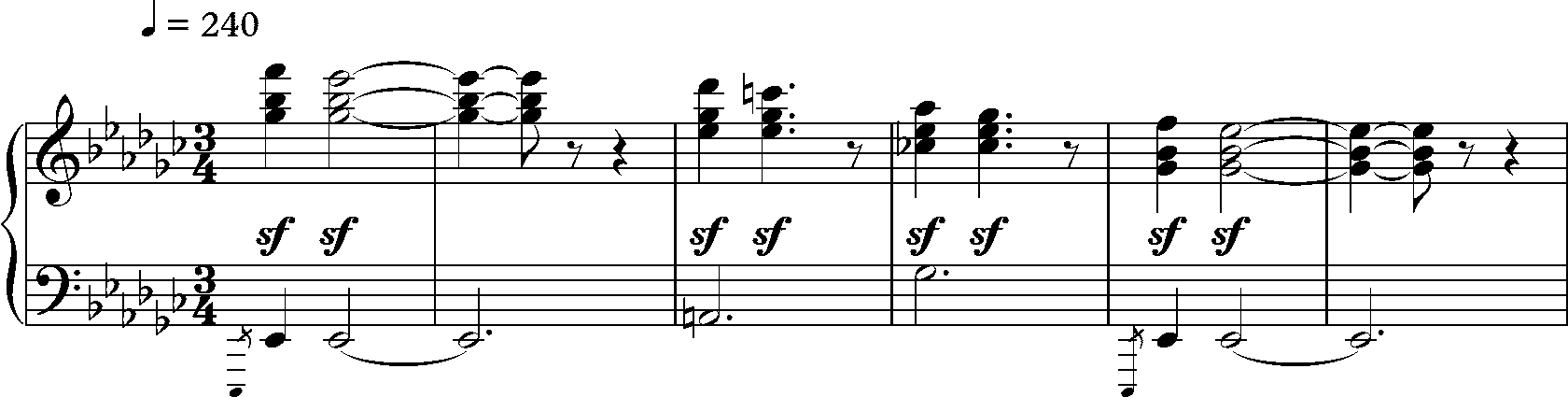
Mussorgsky "Gnomus", original bars 19–25

Ravel initially orchestrates it as follows:

Mussorgsky-Ravel "Gnomus", first orchestration

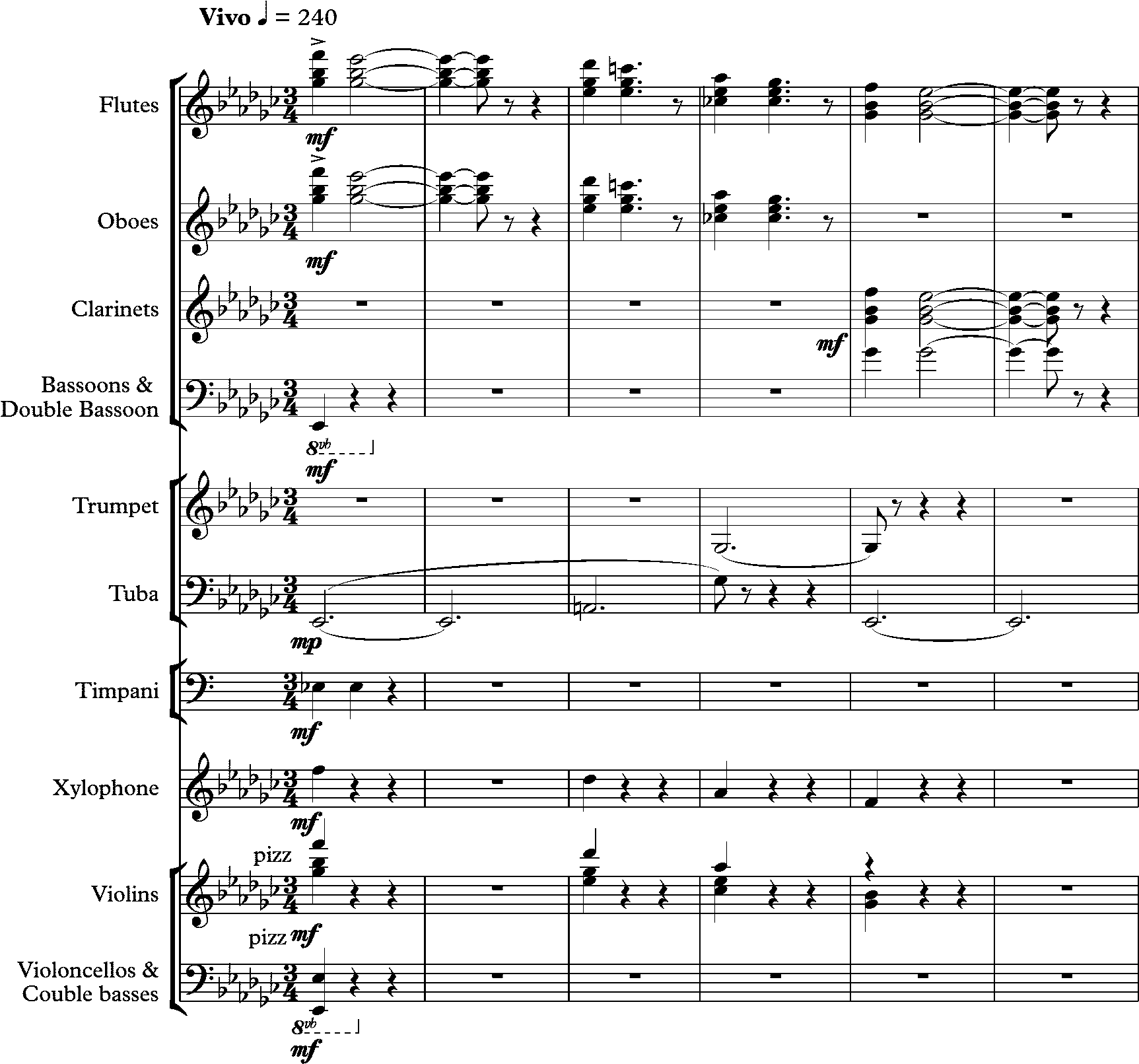
Mussorgsky-Ravel "Gnomus", first orchestration

Repeating the passage, Ravel provides a fresh orchestration "this time with the celesta (replacing the woodwinds) accompanied by string glissandos on the fingerboard".

Mussorgsky-Ravel Gnomus, second orchestration

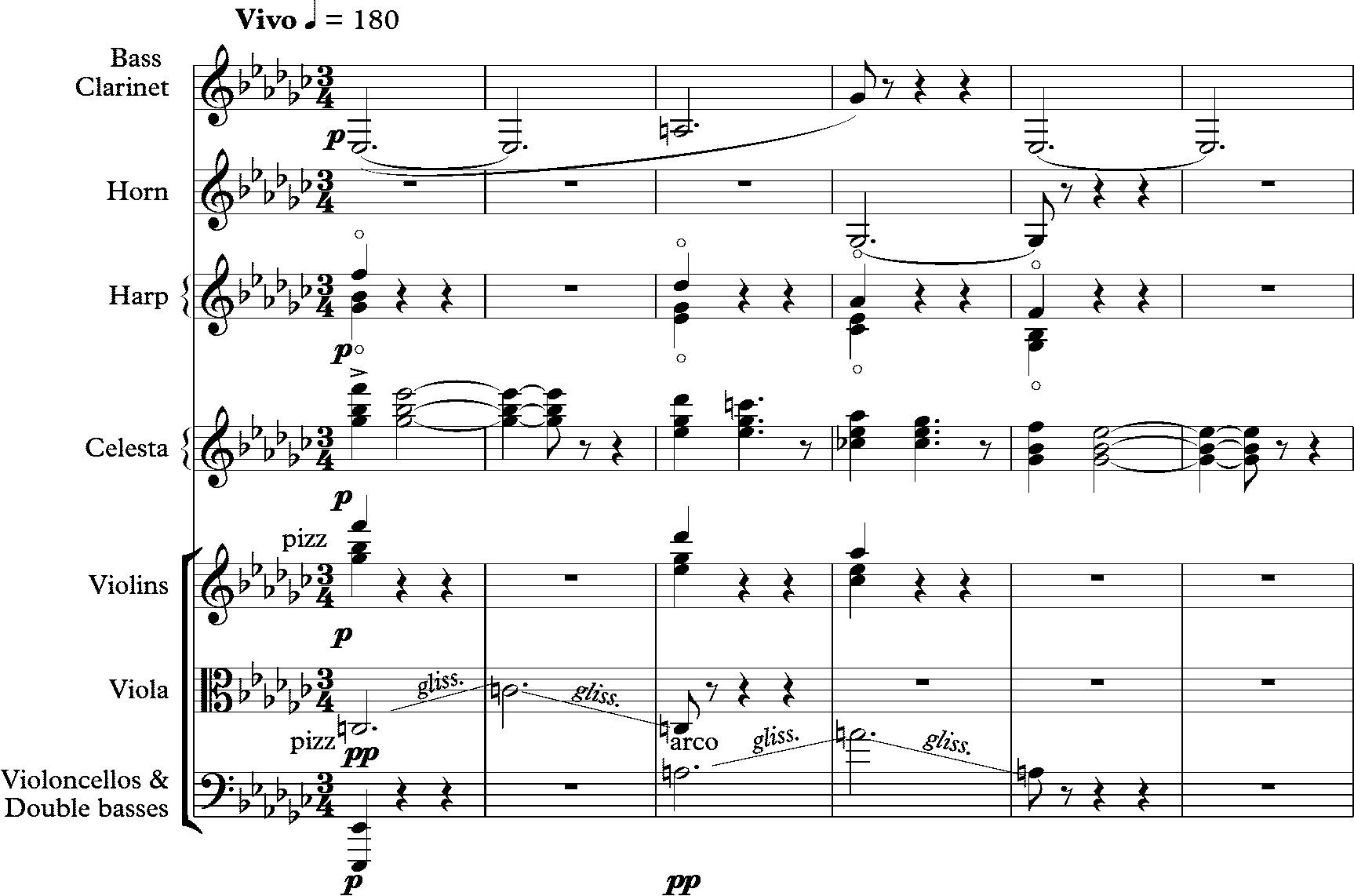
Mussorgsky-Ravel "Gnomus", second orchestration

==== Songs ====
A number of Franz Schubert's songs, originally for voice with piano accompaniment, were arranged by other composers. For example, his "highly charged" and "graphic" song "Erlkönig" ("The Erl King") has a piano introduction that conveys "unflagging energy" from the start.

Schubert "Erlkönig", piano introduction

Schubert "Erlkönig", piano introduction

The arrangement of this song by Hector Berlioz uses strings to convey faithfully the driving urgency and threatening atmosphere of the original.

"Erlkönig", arrangement by Berlioz

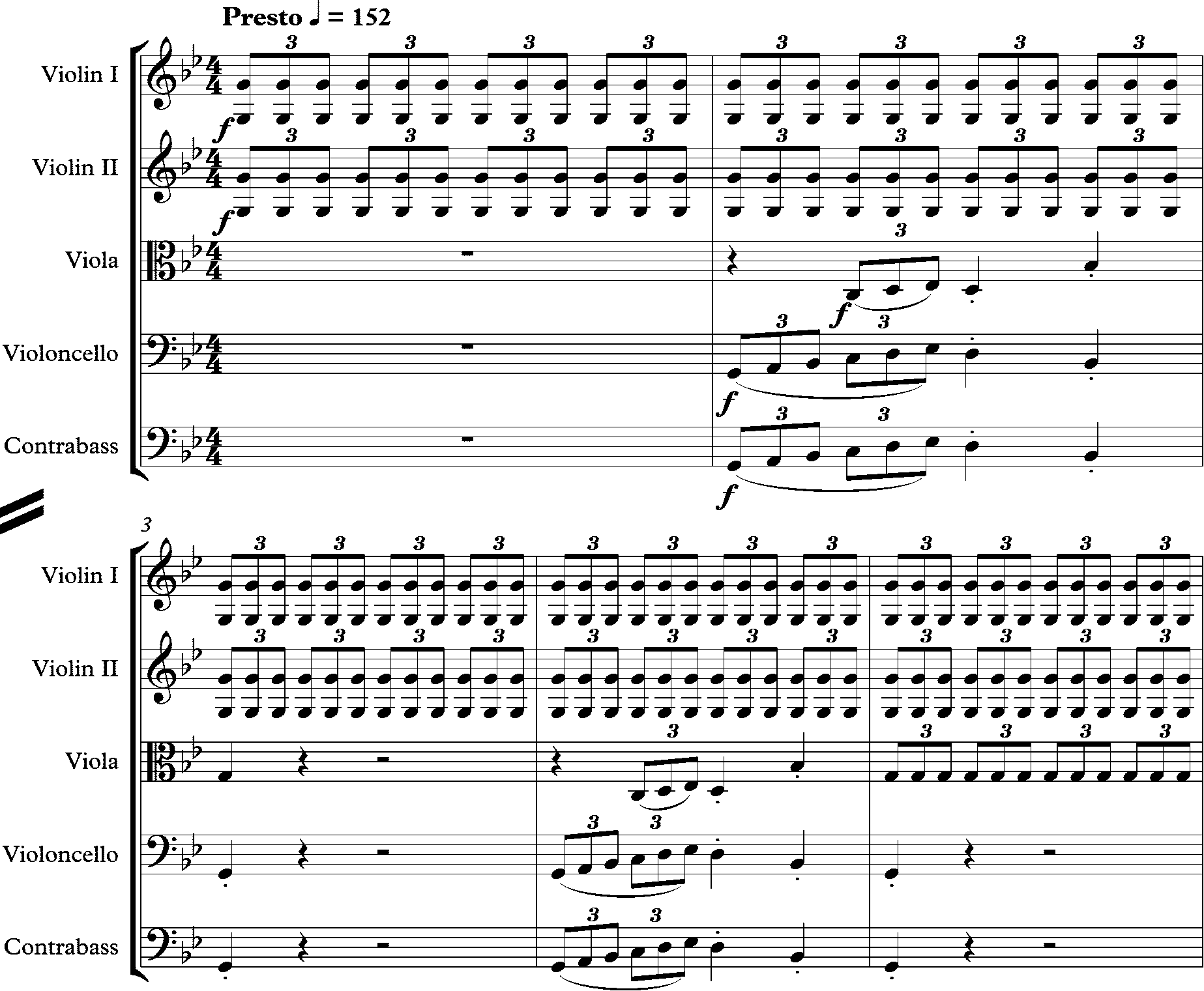

Berlioz adds colour in bars 6–8 through the addition of woodwind, horns, and a timpani. With typical flamboyance, Berlioz adds spice to the harmony in bar 6 with an E flat in the horn part, creating a half-diminished seventh chord which is not in Schubert's original piano part.

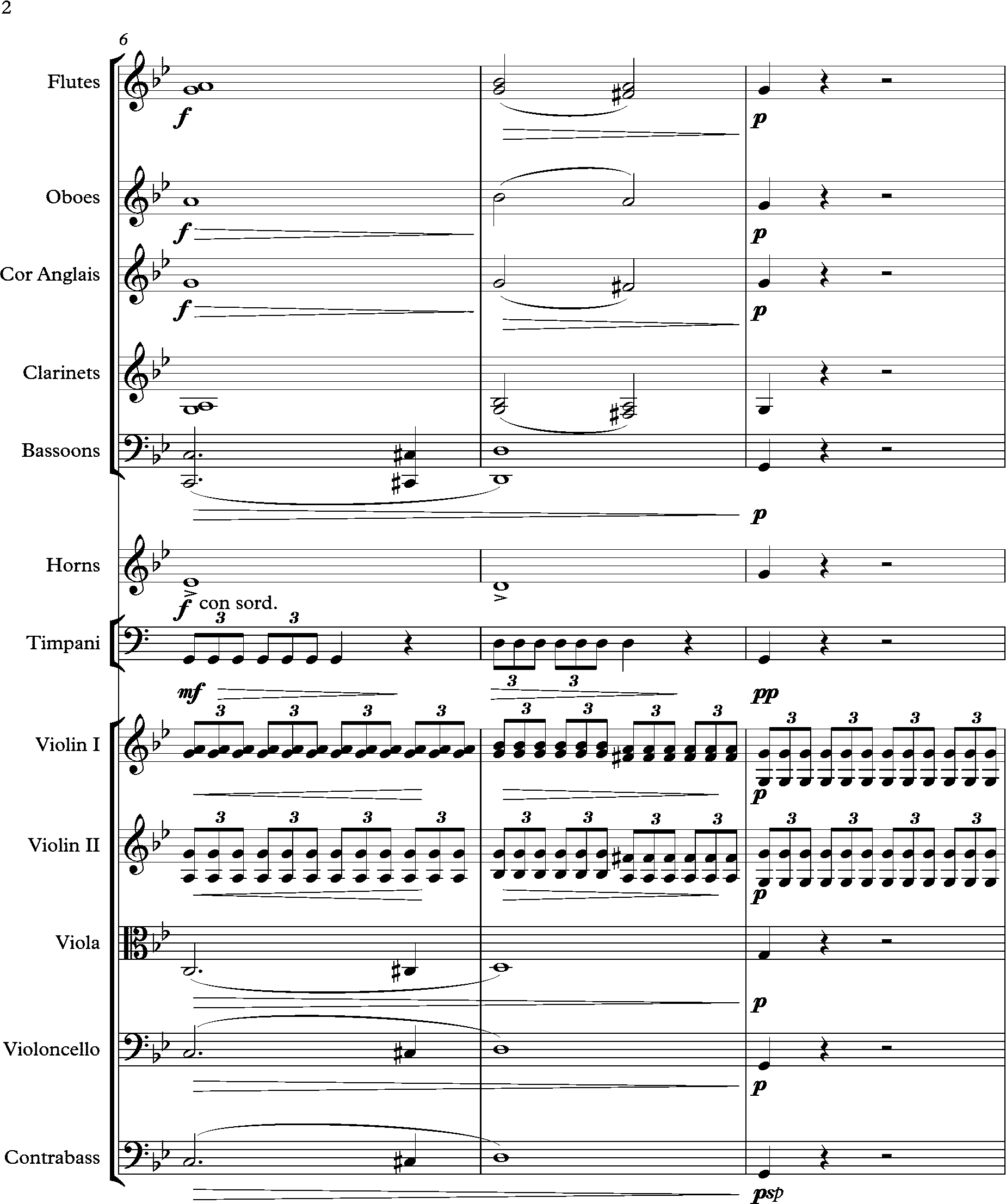
"Erlkönig", arrangement by Berlioz

There are subtle differences between this and the arrangement of the song by Franz Liszt. The upper string sound is thicker, with violins and violas playing the fierce repeated octaves in unison and bassoons compensating for this by doubling the cellos and basses. There are no timpani, but trumpets and horns add a small jolt to the rhythm of the opening bar, reinforcing the bare octaves of the strings by playing on the second main beat.

Erl King - arrangement by Liszt opening bars

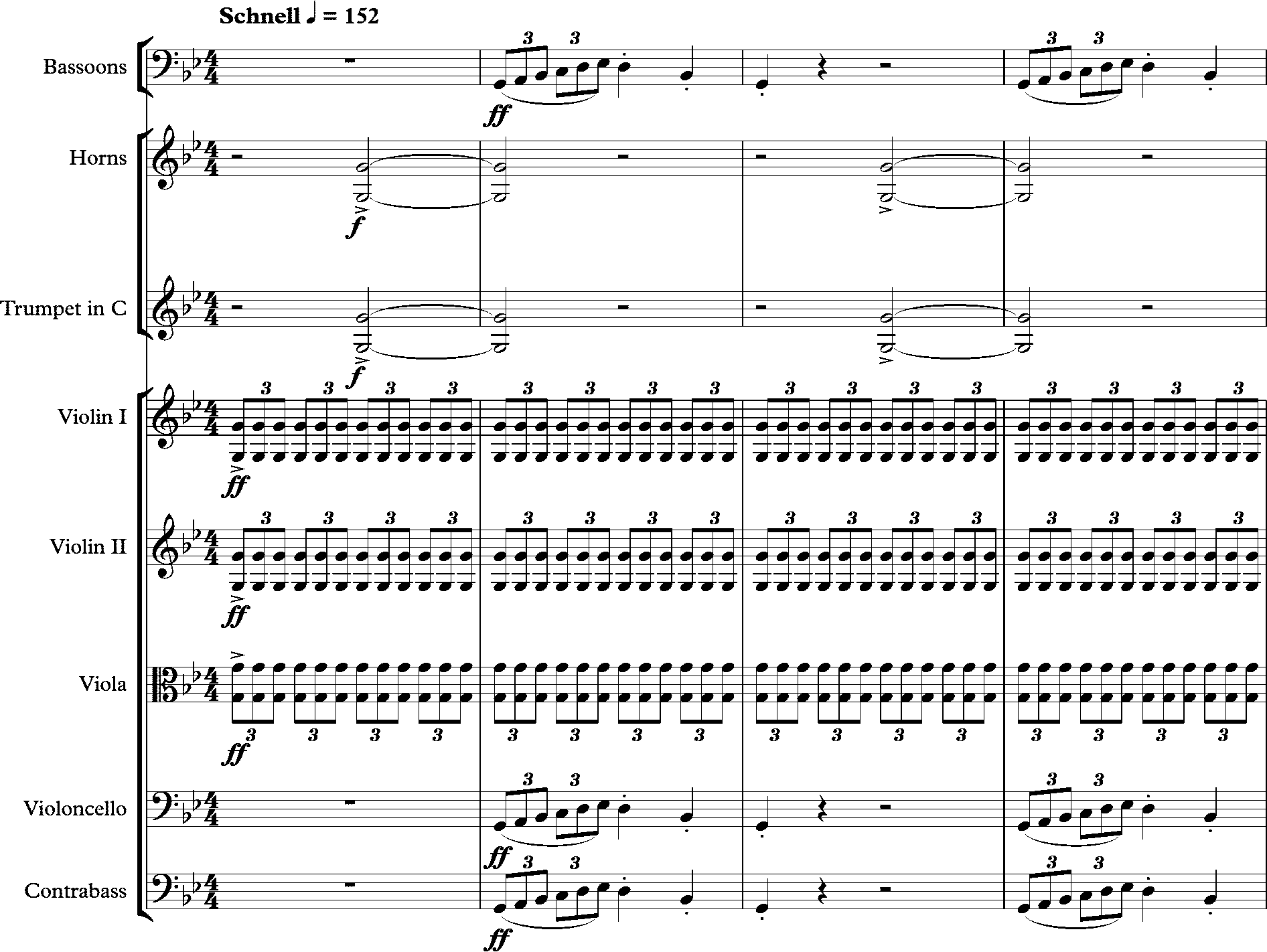
Erl King – arrangement by Liszt, bars 1–4

Unlike Berlioz, Liszt does not alter the harmony, but changes the emphasis somewhat in bar 6, with the note A in the oboes and clarinets grating against rather than blending with the G in the strings.

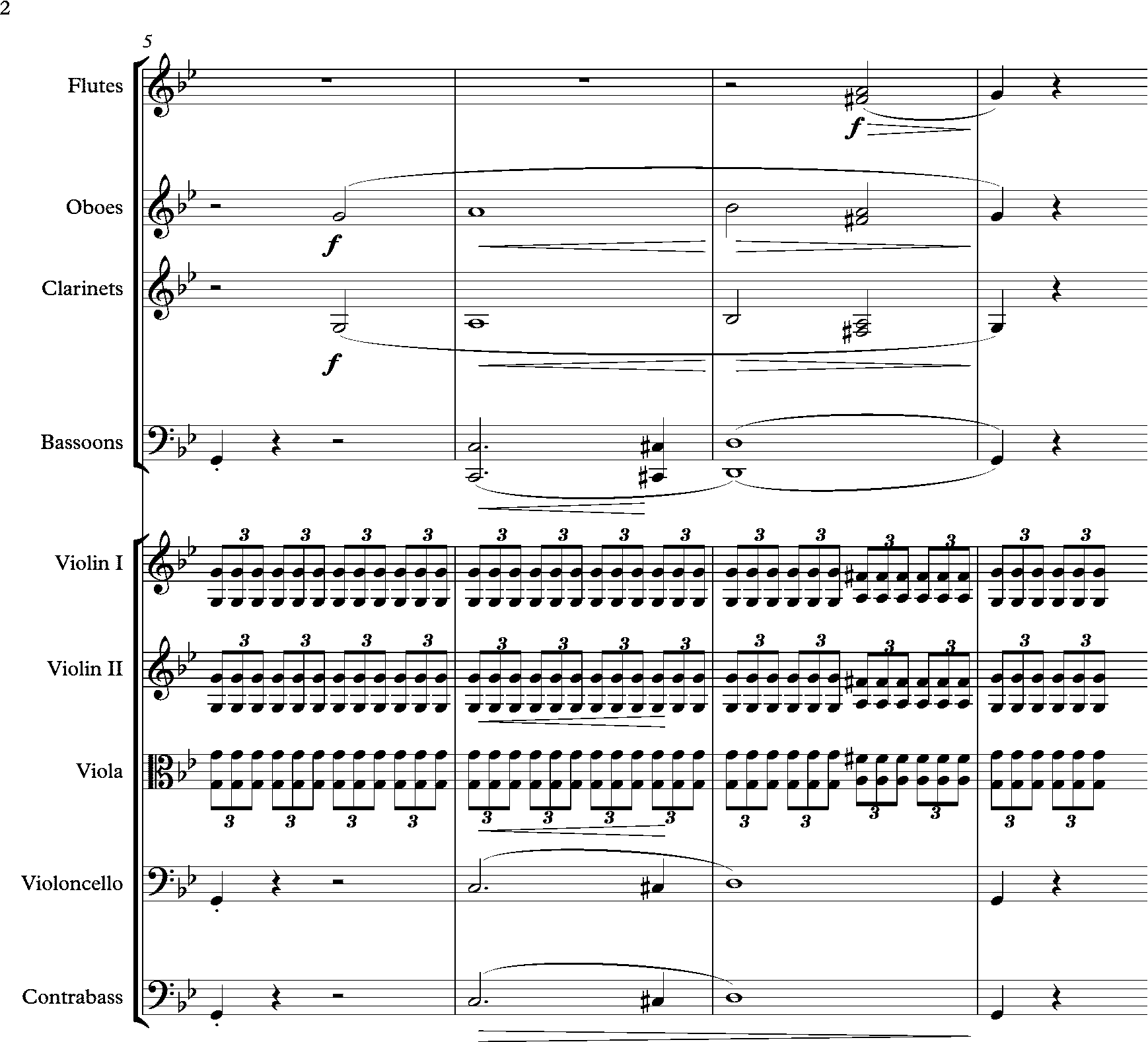
Erl King – arrangement by Liszt, bars 5–8

"Schubert has come in for his fair share of transcriptions and arrangements. Most, like Liszt's transcriptions of the Lieder or Berlioz's orchestration for Erlkönig, tell us more about the arranger than about the original composer, but they can be diverting so long as they are in no way a replacement for the original".

Gustav Mahler's Lieder eines fahrenden Gesellen ("Songs of a Wayfarer") were originally written for voice with piano accompaniment. The composer's later arrangement of the piano part shows a typical ear for clarity and transparency in rewriting for an ensemble. Below is the original piano version of the closing bars of the second song, "Gieng heit' Morgen über's Feld".

Mahler Gieng heut' Morgen uber's feld final bars of the piano version

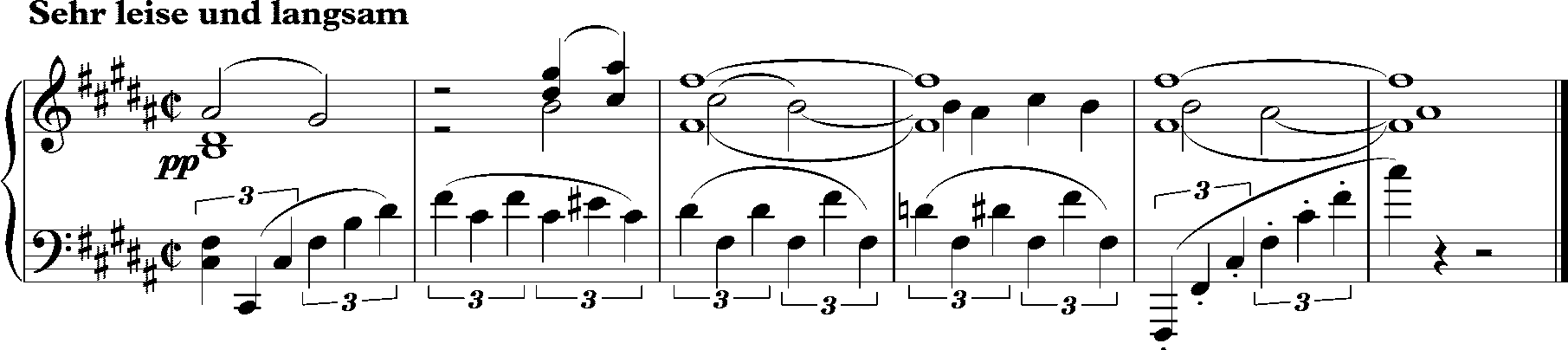
Mahler "Gieng heut' Morgen uber's feld", final bars of the piano version

The orchestration shows Mahler's attention to detail in bringing out differentiated orchestral colours supplied by woodwind, strings and horn. He uses a harp to convey the original arpeggios supplied by the left hand of the piano part. He also extracts a descending chromatic melodic line, implied by the left hand in bars 2–4 (above), and gives it to the horn.

Mahler Gieng heut' Morgen uber's feld final bars of the orchestral arrangement

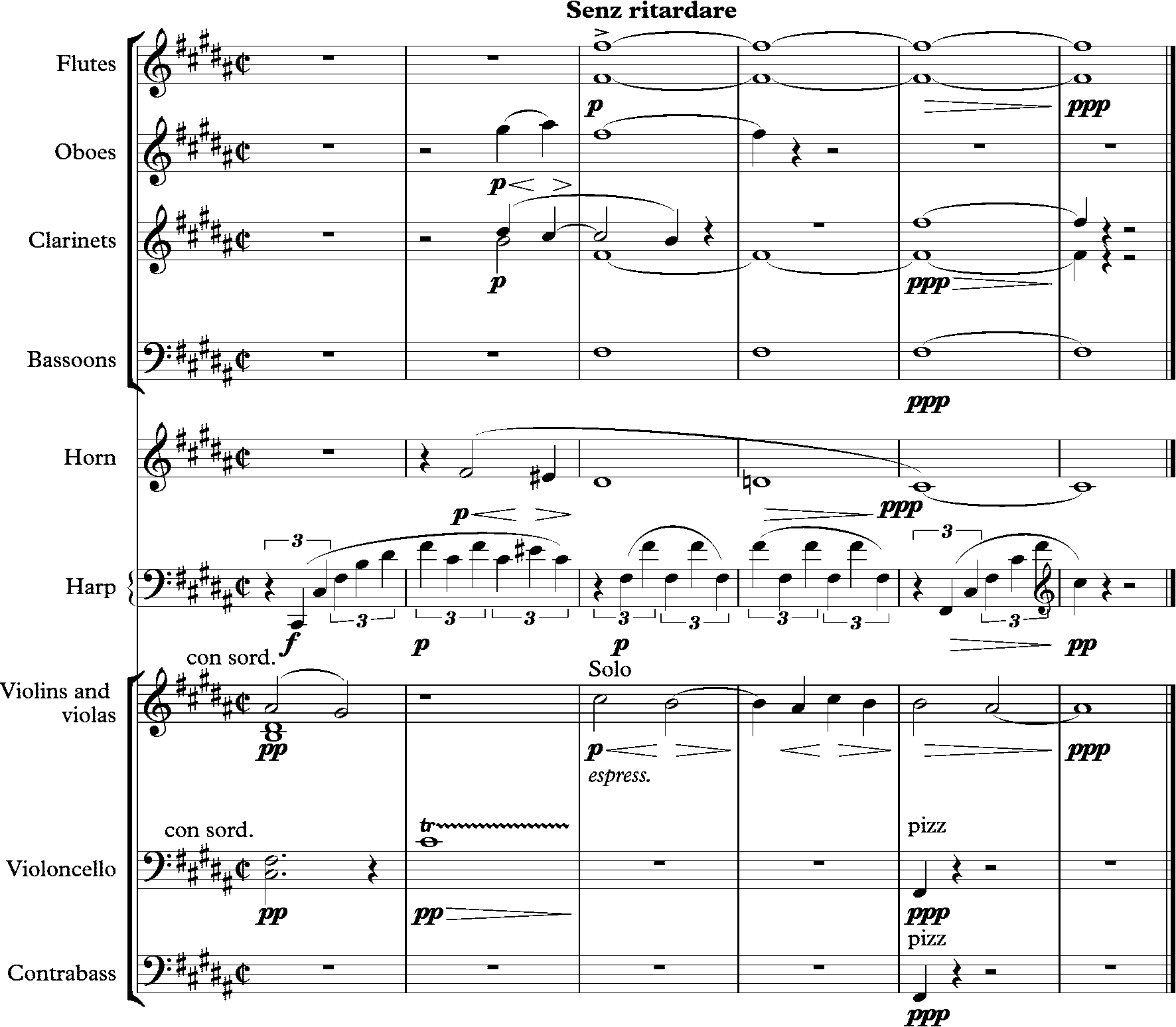
Mahler "Gieng heut' Morgen uber's feld", final bars of the orchestral arrangement

== Popular music ==
Popular music recordings often include parts for brass horn sections, bowed strings, and other instruments that were added by arrangers and not composed by the original songwriters. Some pop arrangers even add sections using full orchestra, though this is less common due to the expense involved. Popular music arrangements may also be considered to include new releases of existing songs with a new musical treatment. These changes can include alterations to tempo, meter, key, instrumentation, and other musical elements.

Well known examples include Joe Cocker's version of the Beatles' "With a Little Help from My Friends", Cream's "Crossroads", and Ike and Tina Turner's version of Creedence Clearwater Revival's "Proud Mary". The American group Vanilla Fudge and the British group Yes based their early careers on radical rearrangements of contemporary hits. Bonnie Pointer performed disco and Motown-styled versions of "Heaven Must Have Sent You". Remixes, such as in dance music, can also be considered arrangements. Gene Kelly once remarked that the most important people in the MGM music department were the arrangers.

== Jazz ==
Arrangements for small jazz combos are usually informal, minimal, and uncredited. Larger ensembles have generally had greater requirements for notated arrangements, though Count Basie's early big band is known for its many head arrangements, so called because they were worked out by the players themselves, memorized ("in the player's head"), and never written down. Most arrangements for big bands, however, were written down and credited to a specific arranger, as with arrangements by Sammy Nestico and Neal Hefti for Count Basie's later big bands.

Don Redman made innovations in jazz arranging as a part of Fletcher Henderson's orchestra in the 1920s. Redman's arrangements introduced a more intricate melodic presentation and soli performances for various sections of the big band. Benny Carter became Henderson's primary arranger in the early 1930s, becoming known for his arranging abilities in addition to his previous recognition as a performer. Beginning in 1938, Billy Strayhorn became an arranger of great renown for the Duke Ellington orchestra. Jelly Roll Morton is sometimes considered the earliest jazz arranger. While he toured around the years 1912 to 1915, he wrote down parts to enable "pickup bands" to perform his compositions.

Big-band arrangements are informally called charts. In the swing era they were usually either arrangements of popular songs or they were entirely new compositions. Duke Ellington's and Billy Strayhorn's arrangements for the Duke Ellington big band were usually new compositions, and some of Eddie Sauter's arrangements for the Benny Goodman band and Artie Shaw's arrangements for his own band were new compositions as well. It became more common to arrange sketchy jazz combo compositions for big band after the bop era.

After 1950, the big bands declined in number. However, several bands continued and arrangers provided renowned arrangements. Gil Evans wrote a number of large-ensemble arrangements in the late 1950s and early 1960s intended for recording sessions only. Other arrangers of note include Vic Schoen, Pete Rugolo, Oliver Nelson, Johnny Richards, Billy May, Thad Jones, Maria Schneider, Bob Brookmeyer, Lou Marini, Nelson Riddle, Ralph Burns, Billy Byers, Gordon Jenkins, Ray Conniff, Henry Mancini, Ray Reach, Vince Mendoza, and Claus Ogerman.

In the 21st century, the big-band arrangement has made a modest comeback. Gordon Goodwin, Roy Hargrove, and Christian McBride have all rolled out new big bands with both original compositions and new arrangements of standard tunes.

== For instrumental groups ==
=== Strings ===
The string section is a body of instruments composed of various bowed stringed instruments. By the 19th century orchestral music in Europe had standardized the string section into the following homogeneous instrumental groups: first violins, second violins (the same instrument as the first violins, but typically playing an accompaniment or harmony part to the first violins, and often at a lower pitch range), violas, cellos, and double basses. The string section in a multi-sectioned orchestra is sometimes referred to as the "string choir".

The harp is also a stringed instrument, but is not a member of nor homogeneous with the violin family, and is not considered part of the string choir. Samuel Adler classifies the harp as a plucked string instrument in the same category as the guitar (acoustic or electric), mandolin, banjo, or zither. Like the harp, these instruments do not belong to the violin family and are not homogeneous with the string choir. In modern arranging these instruments are considered part of the rhythm section. The electric bass and upright string bass—depending on the circumstance—can be treated by the arranger as either string section or rhythm section instruments.

A group of instruments in which each member plays a unique part—rather than playing in unison with other like instruments—is referred to as a chamber ensemble. A chamber ensemble made up entirely of strings of the violin family is referred to by its size. A string trio consists of three players, a string quartet four, a string quintet five, and so on.

In most circumstances the string section is treated by the arranger as one homogeneous unit and its members are required to play preconceived material rather than improvise.

A string section can be utilized on its own (this is referred to as a string orchestra) or in conjunction with any of the other instrumental sections. More than one string orchestra can be utilized.

A standard string section (vln., vln 2., vla., vcl, cb.) with each section playing unison allows the arranger to create a five-part texture. Often an arranger will divide each violin section in half or thirds to achieve a denser texture. It is possible to carry this division to its logical extreme in which each member of the string section plays his or her own unique part.

==== Size of the string section ====
Artistic, budgetary and logistical concerns, including the size of the orchestra pit or hall will determine the size and instrumentation of a string section. The Broadway musical West Side Story, in 1957, was booked into the Winter Garden theater; composer Leonard Bernstein disliked the playing of "house" viola players he would have to use there, and so he chose to leave them out of the show's instrumentation; a benefit was the creation of more space in the pit for an expanded percussion section.

George Martin, producer and arranger for the Beatles, warns arrangers about the intonation problems when only two like instruments play in unison: "After a string quartet, I do not think there is a satisfactory sound for strings until one has at least three players on each line ... as a rule two stringed instruments together create a slight 'beat' which does not give a smooth sound." Different music directors may use different numbers of string players and different balances between the sections to create different musical effects.

While any combination and number of string instruments is possible in a section, a traditional string section sound is achieved with a violin-heavy balance of instruments.

Suggested string section sizes
Reference	Author	Section size	Violins	Violas	Celli	Basses
"Arranged By Nelson Riddle"	Nelson Riddle	12 players	8	2	2	0
"Arranged By Nelson Riddle"	Nelson Riddle	15 players	9	3	3	0
"Arranged By Nelson Riddle"	Nelson Riddle	16 players	10	3	3	0
"Arranged By Nelson Riddle"	Nelson Riddle	20 players	12	4	4	0
"Arranged By Nelson Riddle"	Nelson Riddle	30 players	18	6	6	0
"The Contemporary Arranger"	Don Sebesky	9 players	7	0	2	0
"The Contemporary Arranger"	Don Sebesky	12 players	8	2	2	0
"The Contemporary Arranger"	Don Sebesky	16 players	12	0	4	0
"The Contemporary Arranger"	Don Sebesky	20 players	12	4	4	0

Name	Author
Inside the score: A detailed analysis of 8 classic jazz ensemble charts by Sammy Nestico, Thad Jones and Bob Brookmeyer	Rayburn Wright
Sounds and Scores: A Practical Guide to Professional Orchestration	Henry Mancini
The Contemporary Arranger	Don Sebesky
The Study of Orchestration	Samuel Adler
Arranged by Nelson Riddle	Nelson Riddle
Instrumental Jazz Arranging: A Comprehensive and Practical Guide	Mike Tomaro
Modern Jazz Voicings: Arranging for Small and Medium Ensemble	Ted Pease, Ken Pullig
Arranging for Large Jazz Ensemble	Ted Pease, Dick Lowell
Arranging concepts complete: the ultimate arranging course for today's music	Dick Grove
The complete arranger	Sammy Nestico
Arranging Songs: How to Put the Parts Together	Rikky Rooksby

== See also ==
- Transcription (music)
- Instrumentation (music)
- Orchestration
- Reduction (music)
- Musical notation
- Musical setting
- American Society of Music Arrangers and Composers
- Electronic keyboard (or Electronic Music Arranger), which allows for live music arrangement
- List of music arrangers
- List of jazz arrangers
- Category:Music arrangers
