= Senia =

Senia or Sénia may refer to:

== Places ==
- Senia (Ancient Rome), ancient name of the town of Senj, Croatia
- Es Sénia (formerly La Sénia), a commune in Algeria
- La Sénia, a town in Tarragona, Spain.
- Sénia (river), Spain
- Senia Point, Antarctica

== Other ==
- Senia (marque), a Chinese automotive brand owned by FAW Jilin
- Senia (moth)
- Senia Russakoff (1891-1981), Russian dancer and teacher
