= Rusakov =

Rusakov (Russian: Русаков) is a Russian masculine surname, its feminine counterpart is Rusakova (Русакова). It may refer to

- Alexander Rusakov (born 1980), Russian trampoline gymnast
- Ivan Vasilyevich Rusakov (1877–1921), Russian medical doctor and revolutionary
- Mikhail Rusakov (1892–1963), Soviet geologist
- Natalia Rusakova (born 1979), Russian sprinter
- Nina Rusakova
- Vladimir Rusakov (1909–1951), Soviet general
- Vlady Rusakov (1920–2005), Russian-Mexican painter
- Igor Rusakov (1959-2003), figure skating coach
- Senia Russakoff (September 26, 1891 - December 29, 1981), Russian dancer and dance teacher.

== See also ==
- Rusakov Workers' Club
- Rusakov particle, a fictional elementary particle in Philip Pullman's His Dark Materials
