= Ray Bolger =

American entertainer (1904–1987)

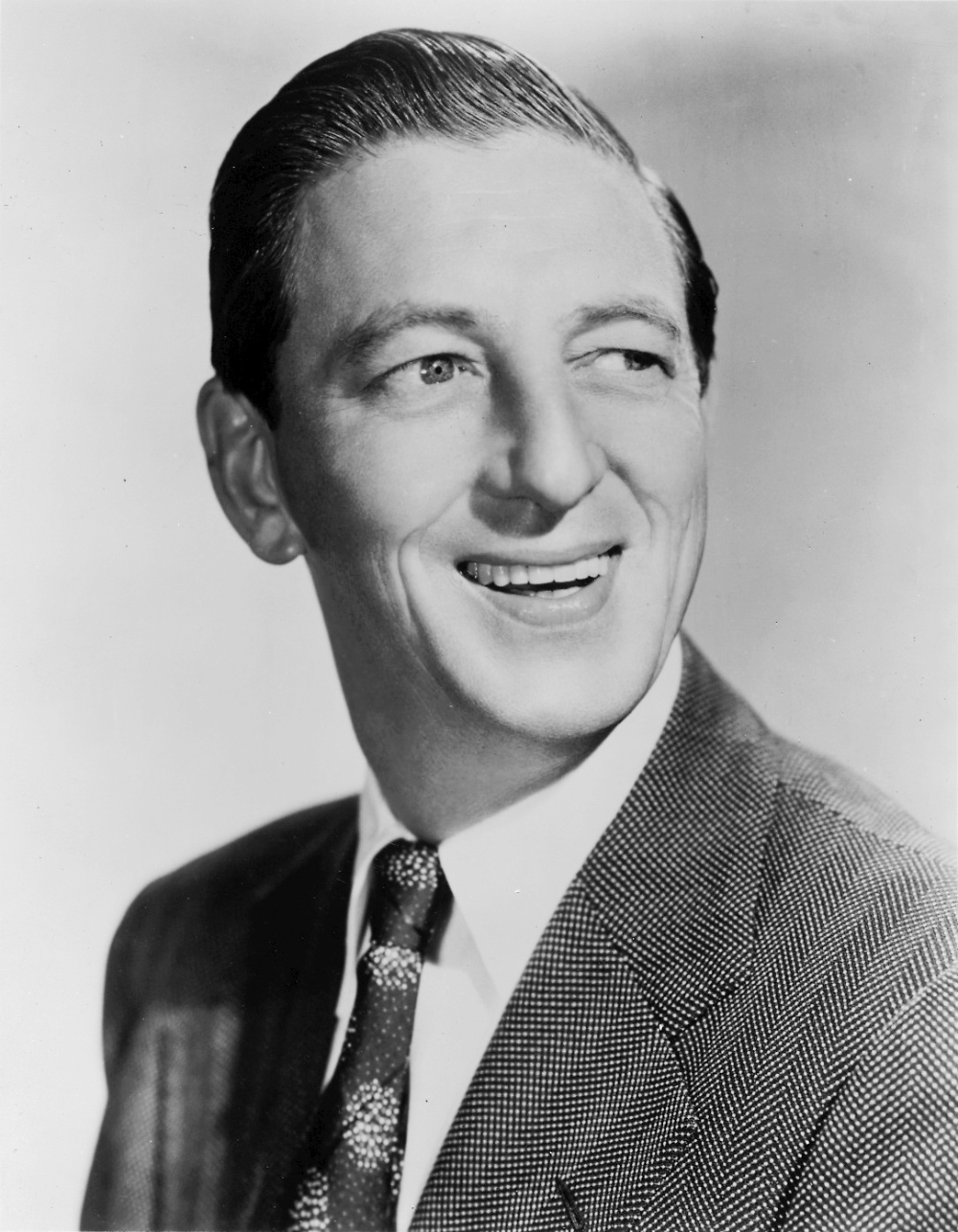
- Bolger in 1953
- Born: Raymond Wallace Bolger; January 10, 1904; Boston, Massachusetts, U.S.
- Died: January 15, 1987 (aged 83); Los Angeles, California, U.S.
- Resting place: Holy Cross Cemetery
- Occupations: Actor; dancer; singer; vaudevillian
- Years active: 1923–1985
- Political party: Republican
- Spouse: Gwendolyn Rickard (m. 1929)

Raymond Wallace Bolger (/ˈboʊldʒər/; January 10, 1904 – January 15, 1987) was an American vaudevillian, eccentric dancer, comedian, actor and singer best known for his performance as the Scarecrow in Metro-Goldwyn-Mayer's 1939 film The Wizard of Oz. He first became interested in dancing as a teenager and, while working as a bank clerk in Boston, participated in dance contests and attended musical performances. In 1923, after being fired from a later job as an insurance clerk, he formed a short-lived vaudeville act, Sanford and Bolger, with Ralph Sanford. He went on to perform in several revues in the 1920s and early 1930s, as well as Gus Edwards' variety show Ritz Carlton Nights (which ran from 1926 to 1929).

As vaudeville declined at the onset of the Great Depression, Bolger moved on to musical theatre and film, playing roles in Life Begins at 8:40 and The Great Ziegfeld before getting the lead in On Your Toes. In late 1938 he was chosen by MGM to play the Tin Woodman in The Wizard of Oz; unhappy with that part, he convinced MGM's executives to let him swap with Buddy Ebsen, who had been slated to play the Scarecrow. As a member of the USO Camp Shows, he entertained soldiers overseas during the Second World War and in 1943 appeared in the wartime film Stage Door Canteen. He starred in his own ABC sitcom The Ray Bolger Show, originally titled Where's Raymond?, from 1953 to 1955. In his later years he made frequent guest appearances in television shows, including The Jean Arthur Show, The Partridge Family, Little House on the Prairie and Diff'rent Strokes.

== Early life ==
Raymond Wallace Bolger was born, prematurely, on January 10, 1904 in St. Elizabeth's Hospital in Brighton, Massachusetts, into a Catholic family of Irish descent. A misconception exists, however, that he was instead of Portuguese descent and named Raymond Bulcao. He was the son of James Edward Bolger, then a delivery wagon driver for a bakery, and Johannah Cecilia "Annie" Bolger (née Wallace). James was born in Fall River, Massachusetts to parents from Ireland. Annie was born into a large Irish-American family in Bridgewater, Massachusetts. They had married in 1902, whereupon they moved to Dorchester, Massachusetts. In 1909 a sister named Regina was born. Bolger grew up in the Codman Square section of the Dorchester neighborhood of Boston and attended Dorchester High School, from which he graduated in 1920. He recounted that, in his high school years, he danced so poorly that nobody wanted to dance with him. He initially aspired toward being a banker instead of an entertainer, until he discovered that "to be a success in life, [he] had to learn how to dance", after his senior prom date abandoned him because the only dance he could do, at the time, was the waltz. His mother, whom he favored over his father, instilled in him a love of reading and introduced him to L. Frank Baum's Oz series of novels. He also liked Horatio Alger's novels.

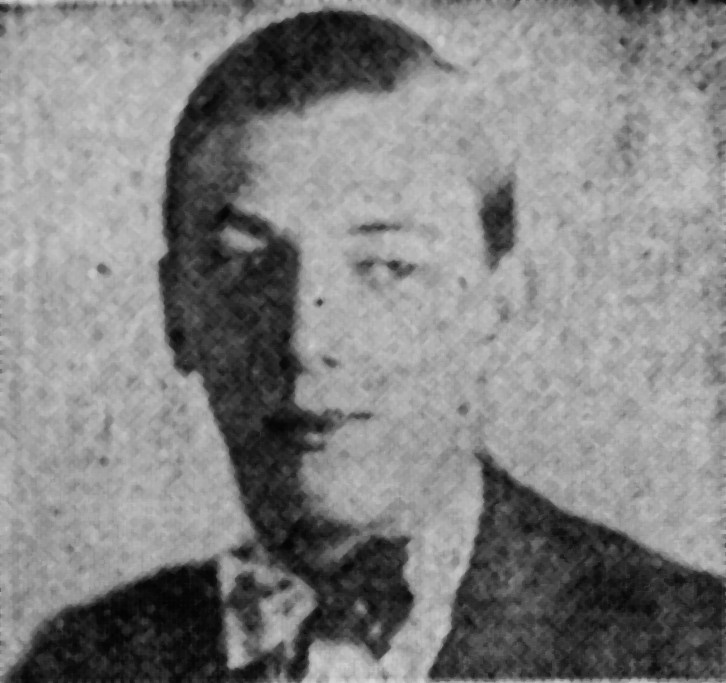
Bolger c. 1928

His parents separated, but did not divorce, by 1918. In 1918 a bout of pleurisy and bilateral pneumonia struck James, who was working as a ship painter for Hamburg America. With James out of work, the family fell into poverty, so for a period thereafter, Ray did menial work for the Kelly Peanut Company and for local grocers. That same year he went to see Fred Stone perform as the titular scarecrow in Jack O'Lantern, a musical loosely based on The Wonderful Wizard of Oz. Stone became Bolger's idol because of his dancing prowess and competency at acting. After Annie's death, in July of 1919, of a cerebral hemorrhage, Ray clerked Boston's First National Bank each afternoon, which provided the family a weekly $18. He would, in his leisure time, participate in dancing contests held in Scollay Square, which was within walking distance of the bank, and attend musical performances in the area. Ray, who is speculated by his biographer Holly Van Leuven to have resented James for "[adding] to Annie's discomforts", rarely ever made public mention of his father.

Bolger said in a 1940 interview that he once sold vacuums door-to-door in New England. Circa 1922 he joined the New England Mutual Life Insurance Company as an office boy and clerk. While delivering mail between offices he would "[dance] up and down the stairs", and he would also dance for the entertainment of his co-workers. The company once hosted an amateur theatrical show, in which Bolger participated. He became a student of O’Brien’s School for Social and Formal Dancing, during which time he met ballet master Senia Russakoff. In exchange for lessons, and a place to sleep (Bolger had been evicted from a room for not paying rent), at Russakoff's studio, Bolger did his accounting. In 1922 Bolger was fired from New England Mutual either for being late or for dancing by the water cooler.

== Career ==
In 1923 Bolger joined the family theatre company of Bob Ott, who recruited him for his "funny-looking face", and performed song and dance with Ott's troupe. James Bolger, who saw in the show business an opportunity to turn a profit, became an advance man and publicist for the Otts, and took a portion of Ray's salary. A year later, under the Otts' management, Bolger formed the comedy act "Sanford and Bolger" with his dance partner Ralph Sanford, who was from Springfield, Massachusetts. They rebranded later on to "Sanford and Bolger: A Pair of Nifties". Despite popularity in New England, and support from vaudevillian Jimmy Duffy (of Duffy and Sweeney fame), Sanford and Bolger flopped in New York, and in 1925 their act was cancelled at Cohen's Theater in Newburgh. Sanford lost interest in performing the act but remained friends with Bolger. In 1926 Bolger befriended composer Harold Arlen during a four-month stint performing at Shea's Hippodrome Theater; for a time, they shared an apartment on West 57th Street. That same year he and Sanford performed, for a weekly $125 split between them, at the Rialto after Bolger improvised a dance for an audition before conductor Hugo Riesenfeld. Bolger was cast by Reisenfeld in a short film, "The Berth Mark", as a banker who joins a troupe of travelling vaudevillians (one of them played by Peggy Shaw) as a condition for paying their fare. He suffered gum and tooth infections from a paste used to shine his teeth for the film. He contracted with J. J. Shubert starting June 6, 1926 and appeared that evening in the revue The Merry World, at the Imperial Theatre, in the minor role of a "collegian with baggy pinstripe pants, a beanie, and an urge to chant fight songs".

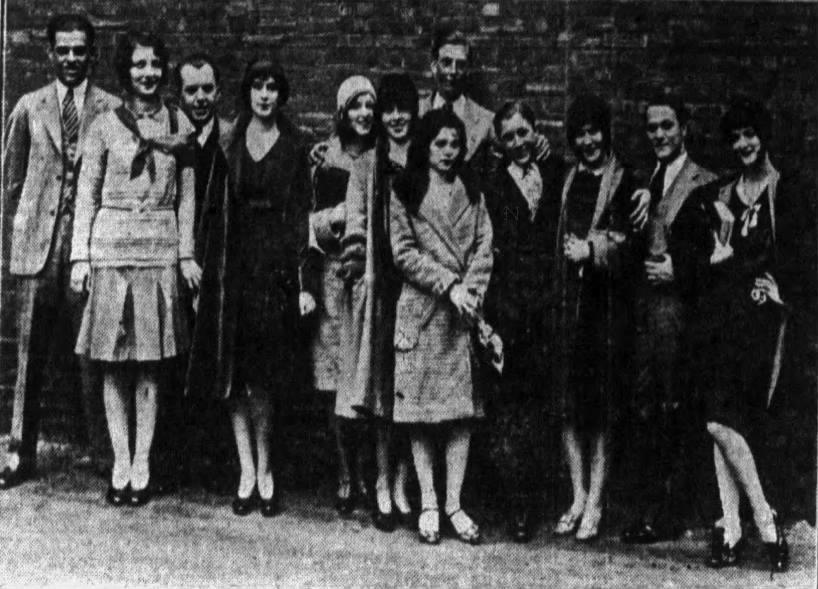
Members of Gus Edwards' revue, Ritz Carlton Nights, in 1928. Bolger is the tall man in the center rear.

Bolger contracted with Gus Edwards, to be a member of Edwards's travelling troupe, on October 11, 1926. Edwards cast Bolger in the troupe's variety show, Ritz Carlton Nights, as a "quick-witted waiter" sidekick to Edwards. With regard to Ritz Carlton Nights, The Washington Post described Bolger as a "'nut' comedian, with emphasis on the 'nut'". Abe Lastfogel, who worked for the William Morris Agency, became Bolger's agent in 1928. Bolger performed in the New York Palace Theatre, which was the United States' "most important vaudeville theater", with the Ritz Carlton Nights troupe in 1929. Bolger danced in nightclubs in London while on his honeymoon with Rickard from July to August of that year. The British liked his sense of humor and energetic style of dancing. Because he had a passing resemblance to George VI (at the time Albert, Duke of York), people mistakenly curtsied toward him. Bolger was cast as Jerry, a "loose-jointed bootlegger", in Me for You, a musical by Alex A. Aarons and Vinton Freedley which began its 1929-1930 run at the Detroit Opera House on September 10, 1929. The show was received poorly and did not sell well, so Aarons and Freedley rewrote it in October; it returned as Heads Up! in November, with the name of Bolger's character changed to Georgie.

The stock market crash of October 30, 1929 and the ensuing Great Depression destroyed the vaudeville industry, which was supplanted by that of motion pictures. In the Midwest and New England, Bolger performed comedy routines at the Paramount-Publix theaters, where films were screened concurrently to live performances. Most other gigs for entertainers, including Bolger, disappeared; to avoid spending money at restaurants and hotels he rented rooms for cheap and Rickard, who traveled with him, cooked his meals. From September of 1931 to March of 1932, Bolger appeared in George White's yearly revue George White's Scandals, which began each autumn in Atlantic City and concluded at Broadway. Walter Winchell, Al Smith, Graham McNamee and the biblical Adam were subject to impersonation by Bolger for the Scandals. Bolger's performances in the Scandals were acclaimed by critics and brought fame to him in New York. In 1932 he was elected to the theater club The Lambs and performed on opening night at Radio City Music Hall on December 27, 1932. President Franklin D. Roosevelt invited Bolger to his 1934 Birthday Ball as a performer. Bolger performed in The Earl Carroll Vanities in that same year but, after a wage dispute with Earl Carroll, quit.

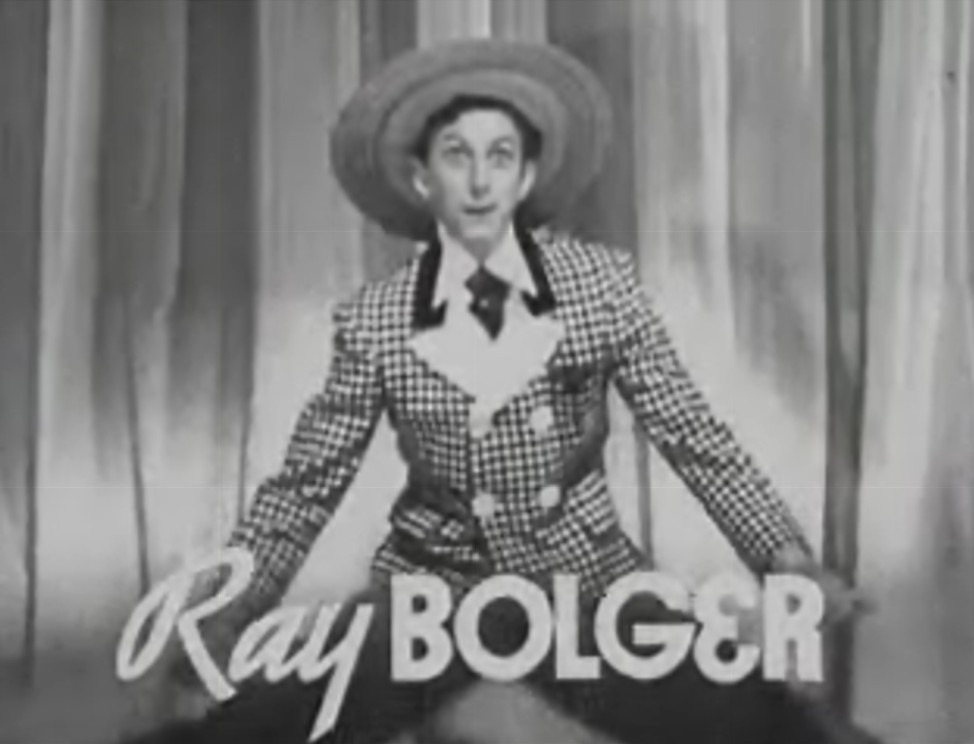
Bolger in the trailer for The Great Ziegfeld (1936)

Bolger played Boccaccio in the musical Life Begins at 8:40, which ran for 237 performances at the Winter Garden Theatre between August 27, 1934 and March 16, 1935. Lee Shubert had asked Bolger to play Balzac, the lead, but Bolger, believing he did not yet have the fame and experience to be a leading man, let Bert Lahr take that role. A contract for two films was made between Bolger and Metro-Goldwyn-Mayer on March 7, 1935. The first was the 1936 musical biopic The Great Ziegfeld, in which he played a minor role as himself and sang the number "She's a Follies Girl". Richard Rodgers and Lorenz Hart brought Bolger into the lead role, vaudevillian-turned-music teacher Phil "Junior" Dolan III, of their musical On Your Toes (which featured two ballet pieces, "Slaughter on Tenth Avenue" and "Zenobia Ballet"); Fred Astaire had been offered the part but refused. The script was edited by writer George Abbott and producer Dwight Wiman at the behest of Bolger, who had told Rodgers and Hart that the musical needed wittier dialogue and a more cohesive storyline. For On Your Toes Bolger was coached in ballet dancing, with which he had hitherto been only slightly acquainted, by George Balanchine. On Your Toes ran on Broadway from April 11, 1936 to January 23, 1937. The dancing required for "Slaughter on Tenth Avenue" went on for fifteen minutes and was so strenuous that Bolger passed out, in multiple incidents, after exiting the stage. Sidekick to Nelson Eddy's Dick Thorpe, Bolger played Bill Delroy in Rosalie (1937), which starred Eleanor Powell as the titular character. Bolger's tendency to improvise was difficult for Powell to work with; and, to Bolger's chagrin, the scenes in which he danced, with her and otherwise, did not appear in the final cut. He was brought on to dance in The Girl of the Golden West (1938), but his scene was deleted. His role in Sweethearts (1938) was an unimportant one of a "Dutch boy clog dancing in wooden shoes".

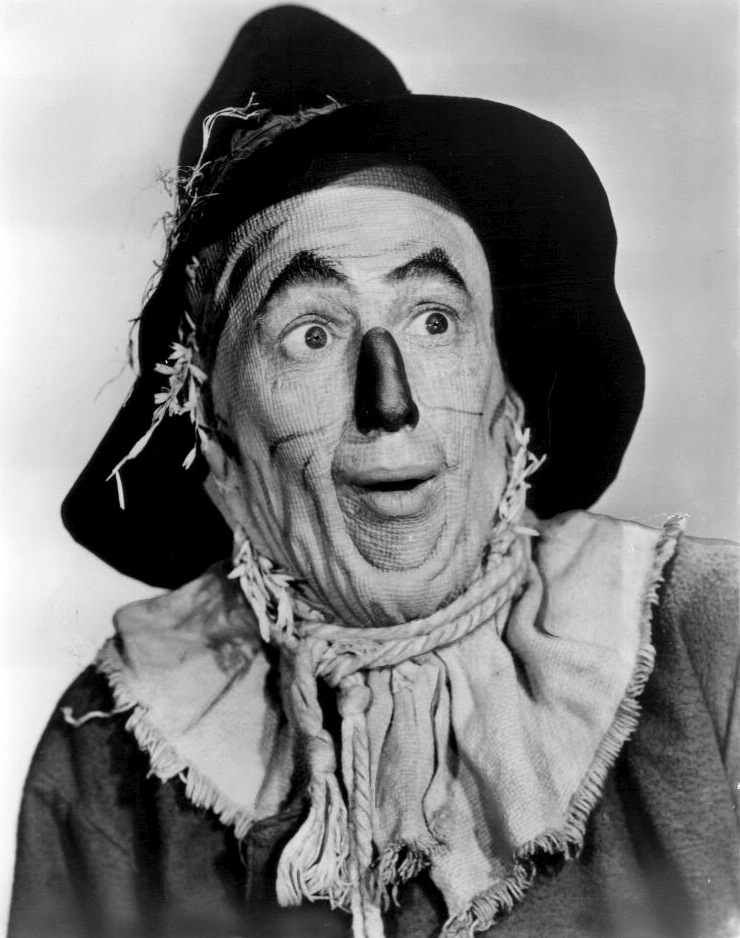
Bolger as the Scarecrow in Metro-Goldwyn-Mayer's 1939 adaptation of The Wizard of Oz

In late 1938 Bolger was selected to play the Tin Woodman for MGM's film adaptation of the Wonderful Wizard of Oz. Although the contract stipulated that he would play any character MGM wanted him to, he was unhappy with the role, as he feared that the metal costume would stiffen his movements, ruining the appeal of his dancing. With a dance, he convinced MGM's executives to let him swap roles with Buddy Ebsen, who had been cast as the Scarecrow. (Jack Haley ended up playing the Tin Woodman, after the aluminum powder used for the Tin Woodman's face caused a severe allergic reaction in Ebsen). The production of The Wizard of Oz was taxing, mentally and physically, for the cast. The costumes of the three male leads (Bolger, Haley and Bert Lahr, the latter of whom played the Cowardly Lion) overheated under the bright lighting needed to make the Technicolor work; and the mask used for Bolger's Scarecrow, which took an hour each to put on and to remove each day of filming, set permanent lines into his face. Bolger smoked and, after returning home each evening, drank to cope. During breaks he, Haley and Lahr played practical jokes upon one another and told stories lest they, in Bolger's words, go "mad". Bolger and Judy Garland (who played Dorothy Gale), according to Van Leuven, had in common a "sensitive, thoughtful nature" and adored each other: Bolger gifted her a copy of Edgar Allan Poe's "The Raven" and advised her to read about her interests in her own time, and Garland showed him affection whenever they met. Until Garland's death in 1969 they kept a close friendship. Bolger met Fred Stone at the film's premiere, on August 15, 1939, in Grauman's Chinese Theater. MGM gave Bolger $87,000 USD (in 2018 this would have been over $1,500,000) for his work with them.

Starting in May of 1940 Bolger and Jimmy Durante led the revue Keep off the Grass. For the revue he, Durante and Ilka Chase sang the song Rhett, Scarlett, and Ashley, in parody of the 1939 film adaptation of Gone with the Wind. Keep off the Grass, which sold poorly and was panned by Billboard as "a Hollywood misconception of what a revue should be like", closed that July, having run for 44 performances. He subsequently performed with Xavier Cugat's and Charlie Barnet's bands in, respectively, the New York Paramount Theatre and the Michigan Theatre. Bolger, having signed a three-picture contract with RKO, was cast as Bunny Billings, opposite Anna Neagle's Sunny O'Sullivan, in Sunny (1941), in which he had three "dance spots" and made the introduction to the song "Who?" (all the song but its first three lines was performed by a chorus). Van Leuven opined that Bolger's first dancing scene, which, contra his usual style, was ballroom, had him "uncharacteristically stiff".

Bolger was deferred from military service in World War II. From September to November 1941 he, Stan Laurel, Oliver Hardy, Chico Marx, John Garfield, Jane Pickens and Mitzi Mayfair entertained American troops in Puerto Rico, Trinidad, British Guinea and Saint Lucia as the United Service Organizations (USO)-sponsored company "Camp Show Unit #1". On December 7, 1941, the Japanese attacked Pearl Harbor and Bolger's performance was interrupted by President Franklin D. Roosevelt's announcement of the news of the attack. Bolger appeared in the United Artists wartime film Stage Door Canteen (1943). In 1942 he starred as Nifty in the musical comedy Four Jacks and a Jill; here, one critic considered him to have "[outdone] himself". He minorly burned his wrist with an iron pan while filming the first scene. In 1942 Rodgers and Hart, deciding that a dancer should be the lead of their newest project, cast Bolger as Sapiens in the musical By Jupiter (originally titled All's Fair). Gwen Bolger helped Rodgers write the script, as Hart, stricken by alcoholism, was in hospital at the time the script was being drafted. The show premiered on June 3, 1942, to generally good reception. Planning to resume touring with the USO, Bolger, on the pretext of exhaustion, quit By Jupiter in May 1943, ending the show (nobody could adequately replace him). Bolger's decision angered both Rodgers (who later wrote to Ed Sullivan a jingle beginning, "By Jupiter is shuttered, so Bolger is a loafer") and the cast. Bolger and Jack Little, comprising Camp Show #89, became the first entertainers to tour the South Pacific, to which they departed on July 3, 1943. Camp Show #89, also of the USO, began in Hawaii; stopped at Fiji, New Caledonia, Australia, Papua New Guinea, Guadalcanal and Kiribati; and returned to the United States on November 25, 1943. Bolger, who had received $1800 from the USO, managed the logistics and his and Little's finances for the tour. Little, a pianist and accordionist, played accompaniment to Bolger's vocals and dancing. In her husband's absence, Gwen Bolger attempted to procure a film deal for him, in a supporting role opposite Rita Hayworth and Lee Bowman, in Tonight and Every Night, a film directed by Victor Saville. This never came to be, as Bolger returned home too late (filming began on November 1).

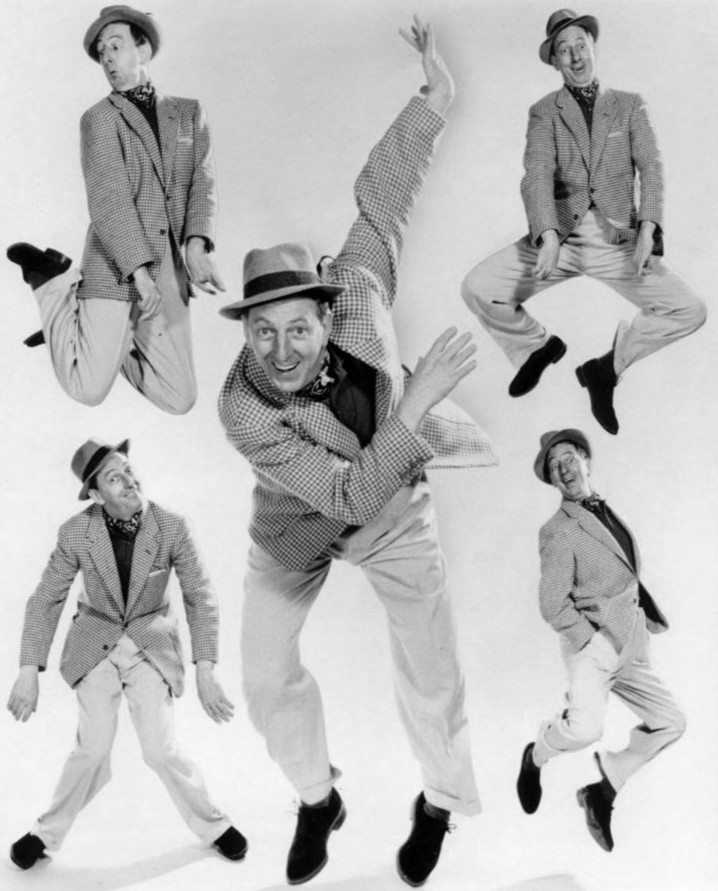
Bolger in a publicity photo for The Bell Telephone Hour, 1963

Bolger contracted laryngitis in 1948 and suffered repeated episodes of it through to 1950. In Where's Charley, which ran on Broadway from 1948 to 1951, Bolger portrayed Charley and Charley's Aunt, making him the first actor to play both parts. In the play, Bolger introduced the song "Once in Love with Amy"; when performing "Once in Love with Amy" live he frequently encouraged the audience's participation. He suggested to Gretchen Patricia Wienecke, one of the show's chorines and also a fan of his, the stage name Gretchen Wyler; she adopted the moniker and would go by it for the rest of her career. Where's Charley earned Bolger critical acclaim and a place among what Van Leuven calls the "elite artists", including Alfred Hitchcock and Margo and Eddie Albert.

Bolger appeared in his own ABC television sitcom with a variety show theme, Where's Raymond? (1953–1954), renamed the second year as The Ray Bolger Show (1954–55). To his surname's exclusion, his character's name in the show was Raymond Wallace.

Bolger made frequent guest appearances on television, including the episode "Rich Man, Poor Man" of the short-lived The Jean Arthur Show in 1966. In the 1970s, he had a recurring role as Fred Renfrew, the father of Shirley Partridge (Shirley Jones) on The Partridge Family, and appeared in Little House on the Prairie as Toby Noe and also guest-starred on other television series, such as Battlestar Galactica, Fantasy Island, and The Love Boat. He had unrealized plans to create "The Wizardland of Oz", which would have been both a theme park and a retirement village, in Palm Springs. Bolger was nominated for the Primetime Emmy award for Outstanding Single Performance by a Supporting Actor in Comedy or Drama Special for his role as Billy Rice, opposite Jack Lemmon's Archie Rice, in a 1975 made-for-television film adaptation of The Entertainer. Bolger narrated "A Time for Living" (1975), the University of Connecticut's short film on how to get ready for retirement, and in 1977 was made a special consultant of its gerontology program as well as of its Center for Instructional Media and Technology. In 1976 Bolger performed the opening number for the 48th Academy Awards ceremony. Film critic Roger Ebert listed Bolger's opening as, in his opinion, one of the ceremony's few good parts. His last television appearance was on Diff'rent Strokes in 1984, three years before his death. Bolger retired from dancing in 1984; he had broken his right hip while leaving the stage after a one-man show and could not dance as well, after receiving a hip replacement, as he could before. He narrated a portion, containing footage from his dancing in The Wizard of Oz, of the 1985 documentary film That's Dancing. For his "contributions to the arts and... humanitarian efforts" the University of Connecticut awarded Bolger an honorary Doctorate of Fine Arts in 1986.

== Style ==
Bolger was informed by the Celtic form of eccentric dance, which required the dancer to be able to flail his lower legs (for which Bolger's long shins and extraordinary flexibility suited him). According to Fritz Weaver he had a heavy dependence on improvisation and "couldn't stick to anything that was choreographed". He could not perform any given dance routine a second time, as he would make it up on the spot and forget it immediately afterward. For his unusually flexible legs he earned the nickname "rubber legs". On his shoes he wore maple taps, in lieu of the typical metal ones, to create a unique sound. He would start using elements of comedy only after demonstrating his physicality. In his routines he acted out the roles of both celebrities and imagined characters for comedic effect. Bolger had limited acting abilities and range, and often was he typecast as, in his words, a "small country boy".

== Personal life ==
In the 1920s, Bolger had a brief relationship with animator Max Fleischer's daughter, Ruth. Bolger met, and was asked out by, Gwendolyn "Gwen" Rickard (1909–1997) in 1926 in the backstage of the Los Angeles Orpheum Theater, after Bolger's performance in Ritz Carlton Nights; Rickard was looking for Gus Edwards, who had departed shortly after the show ended. They separated after Edwards' show went to New York but reunited in 1928 after Bolger returned to Los Angeles. They married in Port Chester, New York on July 9, 1929. James Bolger, who may have disapproved of Rickard's not being Catholic, did not go to the wedding. The newlyweds honeymooned in Europe from July to August.

Rickard, who "wanted to live vicariously" through Bolger, was throughout his career his collaborator and supporter. She advised him on whether to accept roles and gigs, handled his finances, dictated his costuming, persuaded producers of his shows to make the changes she wanted and conceived of many of his creative decisions. In the early years of their marriage she wanted to become a songwriter and to write a novel, but decided to stick to helping her husband's career. They had no children, although they tried. It is unclear why they never conceived; either Bolger or Rickard could have been infertile, though Rickard consulted a gynecologist, in the 1930s, who found no problems with her. Bolger had closer relationships with his in-laws than with his biological relatives (to whom he behaved distantly, even during public appearances), and financially supported his brothers-in-law.

Bolger possessed thousands of records of classical music and was fond of tap dancing to it. His other hobbies included horse race betting, fishing, gin rummy, golf and poker. Bolger was a Roman Catholic and a member of the Good Shepherd Parish and the Catholic Motion Picture Guild in Beverly Hills, California. He was a lifelong Republican who campaigned for Barry Goldwater in the 1964 United States presidential election, Richard Nixon in the 1968 election, and Ronald Reagan in the 1980 election. He supported the United States' escalation in the Vietnam War.

== Death and legacy ==
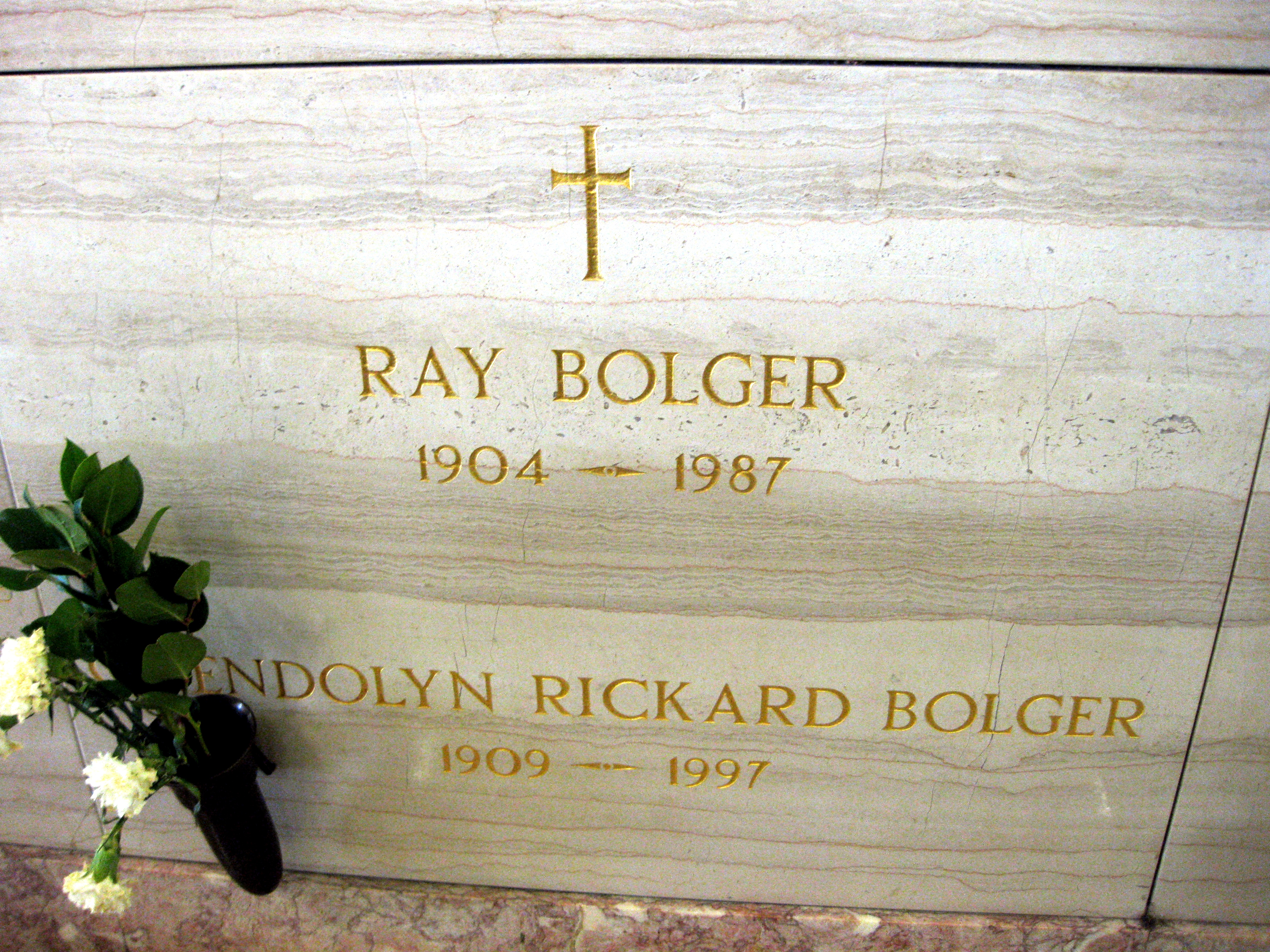
Ray and Gwendolyn Bolger's grave at Holy Cross Cemetery, Culver City

Bolger was diagnosed with bladder cancer in 1985. Initially his wife cared for him at their home in Beverly Hills, but his deteriorating health incited him to check into Nazareth House, a Catholic nursing home in Los Angeles, in November 1986. He died there on January 15, 1987, five days after his 83rd birthday. His funeral took place on January 19 at the Church of the Good Shepherd. Among the pallbearers were Bob Hope and James Stewart. He was not eulogized, per his wife's wishes. His body was interred in the Holy Cross Cemetery in Culver City.

At the time of his death, Bolger was the last surviving main-credited cast member of The Wizard of Oz. He and Jack Haley are both buried in the same cemetery. He was the only one of Judy Garland's Oz costars who attended her funeral (Bert Lahr pre-deceased her in 1967), joining Harold Arlen, the composer of "Over the Rainbow", and his wife, Anya Taranda. They were reported as among the last remaining guests at the conclusion of the service.

Whenever asked whether he had received any residuals from telecasts of The Wizard of Oz, Bolger would reply: "No, just immortality. I'll settle for that." Bolger's Scarecrow is ranked among the "most beloved movie characters of all time" by AMC and the American Film Institute. The costume was donated to the Smithsonian Institution a few months after his death in 1987.

He has two stars on the Hollywood Walk of Fame. Both were dedicated on February 8, 1960, for his contributions to the entertainment industry: one for motion pictures, located at 6788 Hollywood Blvd, and the other for television, located at 6834 Hollywood Blvd. In 1998, a Golden Palm Star on the Palm Springs, California, Walk of Stars was dedicated to him. In 2016, the City of Boston commissioned a mural in Bolger's honor in the Codman Square section of the Dorchester neighborhood. The first comprehensive biography of Bolger, More Than a Scarecrow by Holly Van Leuven, was published in 2019 by the Oxford University Press.

== Filmography ==
Theatrical films
Year	Title	Role	Notes
1926	"The Berth Mark"	Banker	
1936	The Great Ziegfeld	Ray Bolger	
1937	Rosalie	Bill Delroy	
1938	The Girl of the Golden West	Happy Moore	(scenes deleted)
1938	Sweethearts	Hans	
1939	The Wizard of Oz	Hunk / The Scarecrow	
1941	Sunny	Bunny Billings	
1942	Four Jacks and a Jill	Nifty Sullivan	
1943	Forever and a Day	Sentry	(scenes deleted)
1943	Stage Door Canteen	Ray Bolger	
1946	The Harvey Girls	Chris Maule	
1949	Look for the Silver Lining	Jack Donahue	
1952	Where's Charley?	Charley Wykeham	
1952	April in Paris	S. Winthrop Putnam	
1961	Babes in Toyland	Barnaby	
1966	The Daydreamer	The Pieman	
1979	Just You and Me, Kid	Tom	
1979	The Runner Stumbles	Monsignor Nicholson	
1982	Annie	Sound Effects Man	Uncredited
1985	That's Dancing!	Himself – Host	Documentary film

Television
Year	Title	Role	Notes
1953–1955	Where's Raymond?	Raymond 'Ray' Wallace	Lead role (61 episodes)
1956–1957	Washington Square	Host	
1958–1959	General Electric Theater	Stan Maylor / Alfred Boggs	2 episodes
1962	The Red Skelton Show	Mayor Threadbare III	Episode: "The Mayor of Central Park"
1962	The Little Sweep	Storyteller	Television film
1963	The Judy Garland Show	guest star	Garland's weekly tv series
1966	The Jean Arthur Show	Wealthy Man	Episode: "Rich Man, Poor Man"
1970–1972	The Partridge Family	Grandpa Renfrew	Recurring role (3 episodes)
1971	Nanny and the Professor	Uncle Horace	Episode: "South Sea Island Sweetheart"
1976	The Entertainer	Billy Rice	Television film
1976	Captains and the Kings	R.J. Squibbs	Television miniseries (Chapter I)
1977–1979	The Love Boat	Andy Hopkins / Horace McDonald	2 episodes
1978	Baretta	Willie Kressler	Episode: "Just for Laughs"
1978	Three on a Date	Andrew	Television film
1978–1982	Fantasy Island	Gaylord Nelson / Spencer Randolph	2 episodes
1978–1979	Little House on the Prairie	Toby Noe	2 episodes
1979	Heaven Only Knows	Simon	Television pilot
1979	Battlestar Galactica	Vector	Episode: "Greetings from Earth"
1981	Aloha Paradise	Harry Carr	Episode: "Best of Friends/Success/Nine Karats"
1981	Peter and the Wolf	Narrator	Television film
1983	Peter and the Magic Egg	Uncle Amos	Voice, Television special
1984	Diff'rent Strokes	Clarence Markwell	Episode: "A Haunting We Will Go", (final appearance)

== Stage work ==
Broadway productions
Year	Title	Role	Theatre
1926	The Merry World	Performer	Imperial Theatre
1926	A Night in Paris	Performer	44th Street Theatre
1929	Heads Up	Georgie	Alvin Theatre
1931	George White's Scandals of 1931	Performer	Apollo Theatre
1934	Life Begins at 8:40	Performer	Winter Garden Theatre
1936	On Your Toes	Phil Dolan III, Hoofer	Imperial Theatre
1940	Keep Off the Grass	Performer	Broadhurst Theatre
1942	By Jupiter	Sapiens	Shubert Theatre
1946	Three to Make Ready	Performer	Adelphi Theatre
1948	Where's Charley?	Charley Wykeham	St. James Theatre
1951	Where's Charley? (revival)	Charley Wykeham	Broadway Theatre
1962	All-American	Professor Fodorski	Winter Garden Theatre
1969	Come Summer	Phineas Sharp	Lunt-Fontanne Theatre

Additional stage work
Year	Title	Role	Theatre	Ref.
1932	Radio City Music Hall Inaugural Program	performer	Radio City Music Hall	
1969	Come Summer	Phineas Sharp	O'Keefe Centre	
1969	The Happy Time	performer	Starlight Musicals	

== Works cited ==
- Van Leuven, Holly (2019). Ray Bolger: More Than a Scarecrow. Oxford: Oxford University Press USA - OSO. ISBN 978-0-19-063905-1.
- Thomas, Tony (1984). That's Dancing. New York: Abrams.
- Rimler, Walter (2015). The man that got away: the life and songs of Harold Arlen. Music in American life. Urbana, Ill. Chicago, Ill. Springfield, Ohio: University of Illinois press. ISBN 978-0-252-03946-1.
