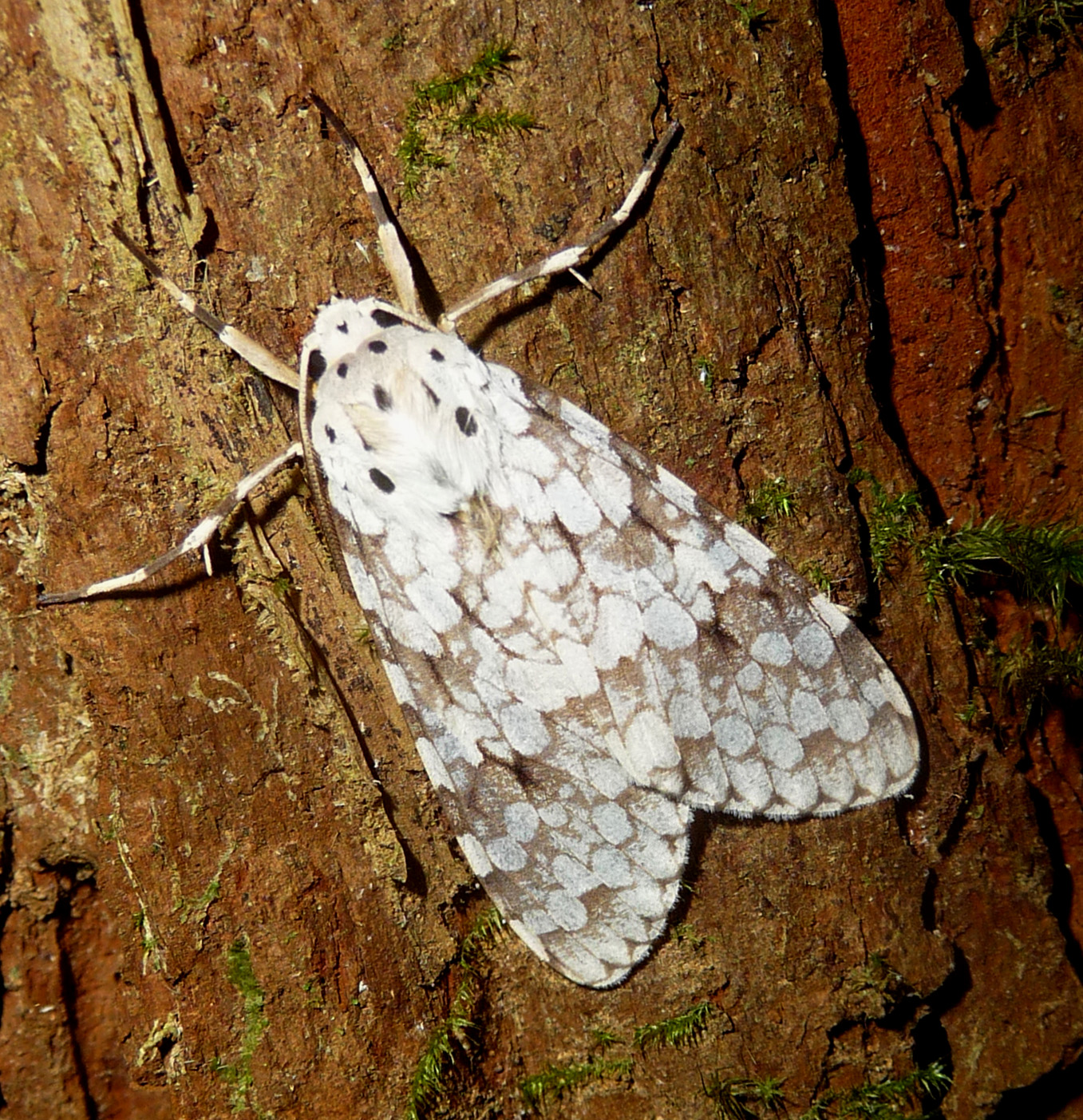

Scientific classification
- Domain: Eukaryota
- Kingdom: Animalia
- Phylum: Arthropoda
- Class: Insecta
- Order: Lepidoptera
- Superfamily: Noctuoidea
- Family: Erebidae
- Subfamily: Arctiinae
- Genus: Carales
- Species: C. astur

Binomial name
- Carales astur (Cramer, [1777])

Synonyms
- Phalaena astur Cramer, [1777]; Carales albicans Walker, 1855; Halisidota pustulata Packard, 1869; Opharus astur cubensis Rothschild, 1909

= Carales astur =

Astur moth

Species of moth

Carales astur, the astur moth, is a moth of the family Erebidae. It was described by Pieter Cramer in 1777. It is found from Mexico to Bolivia and east to Suriname.

== Subspecies ==
- Carales astur astur (Suriname)
- Carales astur cubensis (Rothschild, 1909) (Cuba)
