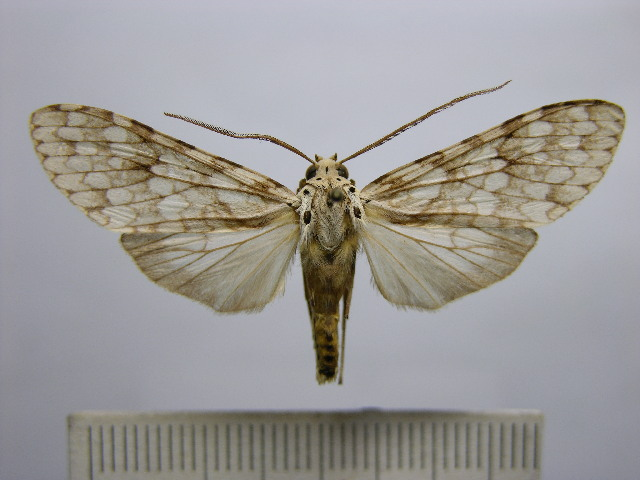

Scientific classification
- Domain: Eukaryota
- Kingdom: Animalia
- Phylum: Arthropoda
- Class: Insecta
- Order: Lepidoptera
- Superfamily: Noctuoidea
- Family: Erebidae
- Subfamily: Arctiinae
- Genus: Carales
- Species: C. arizonensis

Binomial name
- Carales arizonensis (Rothschild, 1909)

Synonyms
- Opharus astur arizonensis Rothschild, 1909; Opharus fumata Barnes & McDunnough, 1910

= Carales arizonensis =

Species of moth

Carales arizonensis is a moth of the family Erebidae. It was described by Walter Rothschild in 1909. It is found in the US state of Arizona.

The length of the forewings is about 25 mm.

The larvae feed on Acer grandidentatum.
