= Carales maculicollis =

Scientific classification
- Kingdom: Animalia
- Phylum: Arthropoda
- Class: Insecta
- Order: Lepidoptera
- Superfamily: Noctuoidea
- Family: Erebidae
- Subfamily: Arctiinae
- Genus: Carales
- Species: C. maculicollis

Binomial name
- Carales maculicollis Walker, 1855

Species of moth

Carales maculicollis is a moth of the family Erebidae. It was described and discovered by Francis Walker in 1855. It is found in Brazil.
