= Four Jacks and a Jill (film) =

1942 film by Jack Hively

- Directed by: Jack Hively
- Written by: John Twist
- Based on: The Viennese Charmer; 1928 in Young's Magazine by W. Carey Wonderly
- Produced by: John Twist
- Starring: Ray Bolger; Desi Arnaz; June Havoc
- Cinematography: Russell Metty
- Edited by: George Hively
- Music by: C. Bakaleinikoff
- Distributed by: RKO Radio Pictures
- Release date: January 23, 1942
- Running time: 68 minutes
- Country: United States
- Language: English

Four Jacks and a Jill is a 1942 musical comedy film starring Ray Bolger, Anne Shirley, June Havoc and Desi Arnaz.

It lost $113,000.

== Plot ==
Nifty Sullivan, a bandleader, saves Katarina "Nina" Novak from being hit by a car, but rather than being grateful, Nina blames him for losing a ticket she had to a concert. Nifty escorts her there himself, then introduces her to his band, Four Jacks and a Queen, the queen being their singer, Opal.

Opal, who is dating a gangster called Noodle, quits the band, which then loses its nightclub job. Nina claims she once was a singer who entertained European royalty, King Stephen, and gets the band hired by a club owner called Hoople who believes her tale that the King himself will come see them perform.

Nifty realizes that Nina is both broke and a born liar. But, by coincidence, taxi driver Steve Sarto, who is trying to woo Opal, is a dead ringer for the King. He comes to the club pretending to be his majesty, but Noodle wants to flatten him for paying too much attention to Opal, and then confusion reigns when the actual King shows up.

== Cast ==
- Ray Bolger as Nifty Sullivan
- Anne Shirley as Nina Novak (singing voice was dubbed by Martha Mears)
- June Havoc as Opal
- Desi Arnaz as Steve Sarto
- Eddie Foy, Jr. as Happy
- Jack Durant as Noodle
- Fritz Feld as Hoople
- Grady Sutton as nightclub patron

== Musical numbers ==
- I'm in Good Shape

Sung and Danced by Ray Bolger

- I Haven't a Thing to Wear

Sung and Danced by June Havoc

- Karanina

Sung by Anne Shirley (dubbed by Martha Mears), Eddie Foy Jr., Jack Briggs and William Blees

- Boogie Woogie Conga

Sung and Danced by Ray Bolger, Eddie Foy Jr., Jack Briggs and William Blees

- Wherever You Go

Sung by Anne Shirley (dubbed by Martha Mears), then danced by Ray Bolger and Anne Shirley

- You Go Your Way

Sung by Anne Shirley (dubbed by Martha Mears)

- Boogie Woogie Conga (reprise)

Sung by Desi Arnaz, June Havoc, Bob Perry and Constantine Romanoff

== External list ==
- Four Jacks and a Jill at IMDb
- Four Jacks and a Jill at the TCM Movie Database (archived)
- Four Jacks and a Jill at the AFI Catalog of Feature Films
