= Richard Holden (dancer) =

American ballet dancer and choreographer

Richard Holden (August 8, 1927, in Braintree, Massachusetts – October 14, 2015, in Tucson, Arizona) was an American dancer, choreographer, choreologist, teacher, musician and writer.

== Early life and education ==
Richard Holden discovered an interest in dance at age 14 and began Russian folk dance lessons in Boston with Senia Russakoff. At 16, he went to New York City with scholarships to study with George Chaffee. the Metropolitan Opera Ballet School and at the American Ballet Theatre school. After dancing for several years in Summer Stock and operating a dance school in Elmira, New York, he went to England to study the Royal Ballet repertory. In England he danced for a year with Ballets Minerva, a touring ballet company. Russian speaking, he then went to the former USSR to study Igor Moiseyev style Slavic folk dance, Vaganova ballet technique and Soviet repertory.

== Career ==
After graduating from the London Institute of Choreology in 1966 with an associate degree in Benesh movement notation, Dame Alicia Markova offered him a contract with the Metropolitan Opera Ballet, where she was director. He danced during the first season of the new Met at Lincoln Center, becoming a soloist. The following year he became the Met's resident choreologist. He later joined the Harkness Ballet, Joffrey Ballet and American Ballet Theatre as the first American Choreologist and certified Labanotator.

With leaves of absence from the New York companies, he founded the Tucson Civic Ballet as director and choreographer (1967–1972), which subsequently, through a series of directors, became Ballet Arizona. He appeared in several Hollywood motion pictures in specialized dancing roles. He has choreographed and staged dance works and productions for companies all over the US and in Mexico, including his Firebird, Upstairs Downstairs, Two Pigeons, Khatchaturiana, The Humpbacked Horse, Chakra and his award winning Alice. Settling in Tucson, he became resident choreographer for the Arizona Opera and formed a Russian dance ensemble to perform with the Arizona Balalaika Orchestra which has toured all over Arizona, into Mexico and the Soviet Union. His writing has appeared in various magazines including Dance Magazine and Opera News as well as The Christian Science Monitor and other newspapers.

== Illness and death ==
In 2011 he was successfully treated for bladder cancer. Complications from a later relapse of the cancer into the kidneys resulted in his death on October 14, 2015.
