= Washington Square (TV series) =

American television series (1956–1957)

Washington Square is an American musical comedy television series that was broadcast on NBC beginning on October 21, 1956, and ending on June 13, 1957.

== Format ==
Star Ray Bolger portrayed a talent agent who sought performers in New York City. The set of Washington Square was modeled after the area of the same name in New York City, including components representing Greenwich Village Inn and Washington Square Playhouse. Bolger said that the facilities were flexible enough to stage a dramatic or comedy show "using the stage of the playhouse as our set . . . or we could do a whole variety show in the inn or as an outdoor production on a set representing Washington Square Park".

== Cast and guests ==
In addition to Bolger, Elaine Strich played the operator (and mistress of ceremonies) of the Village Inn. The dance duo Mata and Hari played instructors in a school of dance. Daniza Illitsch initially played Mama Rosa, with Kay Armen succeeding her. Other regulars were Rusty Draper, The Three Flames, and the Bil and Cora Baird Puppets. Music was provided by the Charles Sanford Orchestra. Guest stars included The Andrews Sisters, Jose Greco, Vera Ellen, Richard Haydn, Sammy Davis Jr., Bert Lahr, and Charles Laughton.

== Schedule ==
The program's regular time slot was 4 - 5 p.m. Eastern Time on alternate Sundays, with Wide Wide World as the alternate show. Four additional episodes were scheduled on week nights in May and June 1957. Episodes were broadcast live in compatible color. Producer William A. Bacher compared the Sunday afternoon slot to out-of-town performances of plays, providing opportunities to make improvements without "constant harassment and the usual nighttime disaster reports".

Competing programs included College Press Conference and Medical Horizons on ABC, while CBS initially had NFL football and CBS Sunday News and later had Odyssey.

== Production ==
Besides Bacher as producer, Greg Garrison was the director. Mac Benoff was the head writer, aided by Al Schwartz and Buddy Arnold. Jerry Herman wrote the music. Mata and Hari were choreographers in addition to their on-camera roles. Helene Curtis Industries, Inc. and Royal McBee Corp. sponsored the program.

== Reception ==
Critic Jack Gould found Bolger hampered by aspects of TV production in the premiere episode. In a review in The New York Times, Gould complimented Bolger's dancing grace but said "for reasons that remain mystifying, television producers feel compelled to burden Mr. Bolger with a book". Gould added, "Understandably, even the writers finally gave up and settled for a variety show, but not before removing the spirit and pep from the proceedings".

A review of the same episode in the trade publication Broadcasting praised the program, complimenting the overall production while praising Bolger's work in particular. "But what really mattered," it said, "was that Ray sang and danced for a good part of the hour and that he repeated 'The Old Soft Shoe' routine that stopped the show as successfully on TV as it used to do on the Broadway stage".
