= New Big Band =

New Big Band is a term used to refer to the revivalist movement of 21st Century Jazz artists who are bringing a new form of Big Band music that fuses elements of traditional swing bands of leaders like Duke Ellington and Count Basie whose popularity peaked from the 1930s through the 1950s with the more intense sounds produced by smaller groups of the Bop era of the 1950s and beyond. The distinction between big bands that survived the 1970s and several big bands that have had some success in different parts of the world is that the sporadic big bands between the fall of the Big Band era and 2000 have been more preservationist in nature. The New Big Band movement is developing a new original jazz literature of fresh compositions as well as modern reinterpretations of standards through new arrangements that conform to the new style being presented to the public.

Live appearances of the bands is restricted usually to small clubs in New York and other large cities that make it financially viable to travel with a sizable band unit of 15-22 musicians playing up to 30 instruments. Saxophone section musicians play one or more additional instruments to cover the band's need for flute, clarinet, and bass clarinet in addition to soprano and baritone saxophone parts.

Jazz artists and band leaders like Christian McBride, Roy Hargrove, trombonist Wycliffe Gordon and Gordon Goodwin have assembled their own big band units. A surviving big band the Mingus Big Band has also capitalized on the revival.

== Awards ==
New Big Band has been well received. Roy Hargrove's 2010 album, "Emergence" was nominated for a GRAMMY, and Christian McBride's album, "The Good Feeling" won a rare GRAMMY for Best Large Jazz Ensemble Recording in February 2012. Wycliffe Gordon's tribute to Louis Armstrong "Hello Pops" was also critically well received.
