= Michigan Theater =

Michigan Theater or Michigan Theatre may refer to:

- Michigan Theater (Ann Arbor, Michigan)
- Michigan Theatre (Detroit)
- Michigan Theatre (Jackson, Michigan)
- Frauenthal Theater (Muskegon) (former name, Michigan Theater)
