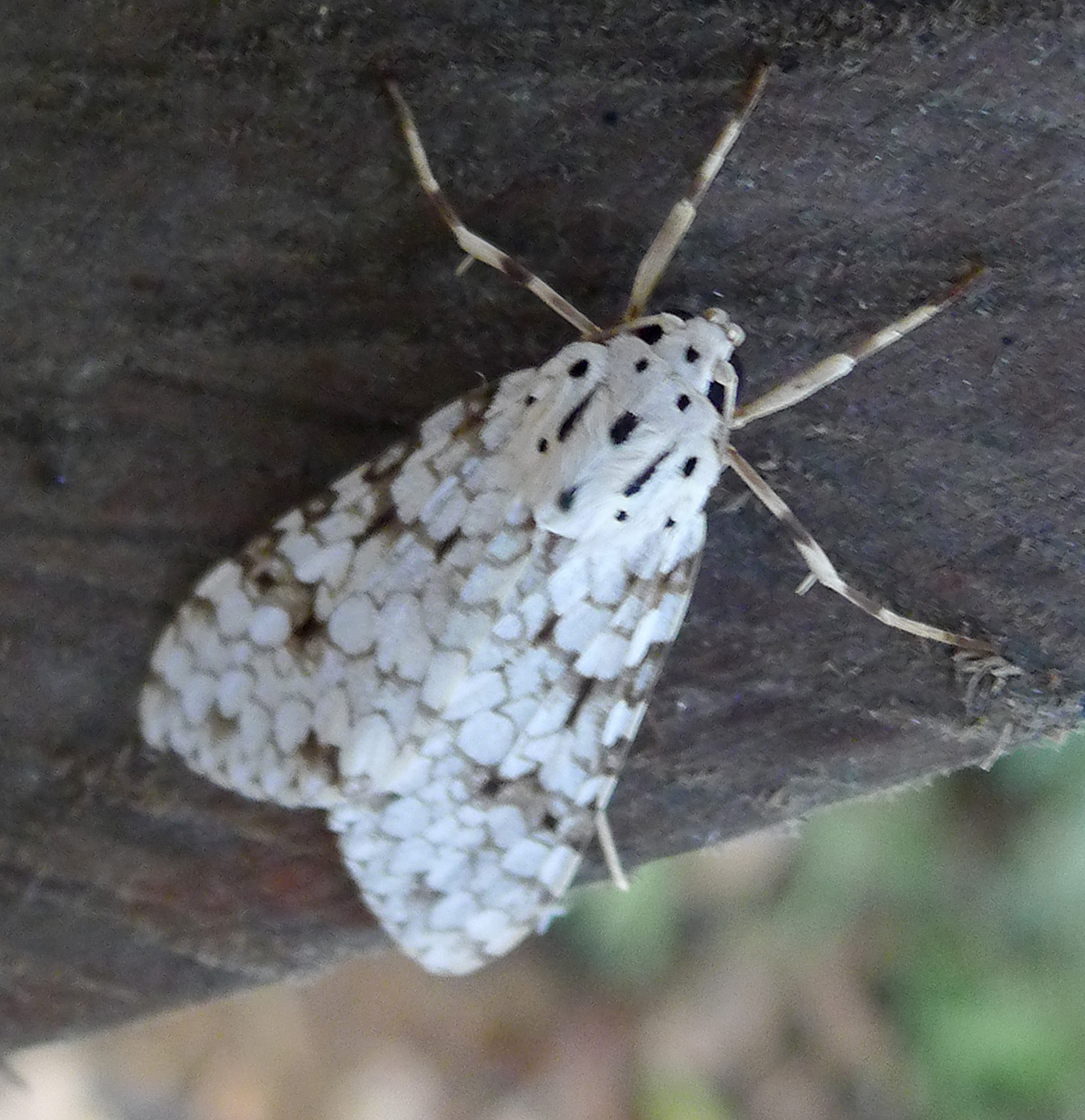
- Carales astur

Scientific classification
- Domain: Eukaryota
- Kingdom: Animalia
- Phylum: Arthropoda
- Class: Insecta
- Order: Lepidoptera
- Superfamily: Noctuoidea
- Family: Erebidae
- Subfamily: Arctiinae
- Subtribe: Phaegopterina
- Genus: Carales; Walker, 1855

Synonyms
- Senia Möschler, 1878

= Carales (moth) =

Genus of moths

Carales is a genus of moths in the family Erebidae. The genus was erected by Francis Walker in 1855.

== Species ==
- Carales astur (Cramer, [1777])
- Carales arizonensis (Rothschild, 1909)
- Carales maculicollis Walker, 1855
