= American Society of Music Arrangers and Composers =

Non-profit musician's rights organization

ASMAC Logo

The American Society of Music Arrangers and Composers is an organization whose mission is to promote the arts of Music Arranging, Composition and Orchestration within the entertainment industry community and the general public. The ASMAC was founded in 1938.

== ASMAC ==
The American Society of Music Arrangers and Composers (ASMAC) was founded in 1938. It welcomes all composers as either associate or full members. The creation of ASMAC started with a various amount of composers and arrangers who were writing music for films, they were not getting the appreciation that they deserved and they decided to join together to make a group to promote their work and to educate the masses in their field of study. Members originally dubbed their group "The American Society of Music Arrangers" (ASMA), the predecessor to ASMAC. With eight studios hiring orchestras at the time of their creation, one of the group's first goals was to be fully employed. Another one of their early goals was to get royalties for their orchestrations, a goal that has still not been achieved in the year 2008.

Other areas, where they have had more success, include: screen credit, better working conditions, improved union scales, even parking privileges, and anything they could think of to improve their lot.

Robert Russell Bennett was ASMA's first president. ASMA became ASMAC in 1987 recognizing the fact that most members were also practicing composers.

The membership now numbers over 500 and has expanded to those who are, or have been, active in the preparation of music for movies, theatre, recording, television and live performances.

ASMAC also holds workshops, seminars and gives scholarships to deserving students.

The biggest event of the year for ASMAC is the Golden Score Awards Dinner, which features the Golden Score Award (Composing), the Irwin Kostal Award (Arranging) and/or the President's Award (Non-composing).

== Scholarships ==
The ASMAC organization offers two scholarship competitions for young composers/arrangers. One competition is for a Big Band where the participant writes an arrangement or a new composition for a big band and the second is for a Chamber ensemble, where the participant will write a composition for a Chamber group. Each competition offers numerous cash prizes plus a rehearsal reading and recording by some of Los Angeles’ finest musicians. Each contestant must be a member of ASMAC or join ASMAC at the time of entry.

== 75th Anniversary ==
In 2013, ASMAC had its 75th birthday as an organization and had a massive anniversary celebration up which almost 400 people attended. Leading the group at this celebration was notable film composer Michael Giacchino.

Many members of the group gave their own testament at this festival including members such as Van Alexander (composer of the Ella Fitzgerald standard "A Tisket, A Tasket") Johnny Mandel (Mash and The SandPiper) Laurence Rosentha (The Miracle Worker, Becket) Doug Bsterman (Broadway Orchestrator), and many others.

At the event there were many tributes to the members which included Videos and Live Bands performing works by the members.
