= Senia Russakoff =

Russian dancer and teacher

Senia Russakoff (Note: Senia (Russian: Сеня) is a diminutive for several Russian given names) (September 26, 1891 - December 29, 1981) was a Russian dancer and dance teacher.

== Biography ==
Russakoff grew up in St. Petersburg, Russia, where for a short while he attended the Imperial Ballet School. Leaving Russia during the Russian Revolution he danced in various theaters in Copenhagen, then came to the United States in 1907 where he joined the Keith-Albee-Orpheum vaudeville circuits as a member of the Golden Troupe of Russian dancers. He also was a member of Anna Pavlova's company until 1919.

Settling in Boston, he became well known as a teacher of ballet and character dance from 1920 to 1978. Ray Bolger was among his students, later to become famous with his role as the Scarecrow in The Wizard Of Oz. American dancer/choreologist Richard Holden gained his first exposure to Russian folk and character styles from Russakoff. Many dancers on tour in Boston visited his studio, known as the "school of leaps and bounds". It was first located in the Gainsborough Building across the street from New England Conservatory of Music and finally at 431 Boylston Street where he taught along with his wife, Regina.

In 1926 he formed the Boston Ballet Concerto Company, the first of several ballet groups that he started, usually performing at Jordan Hall in the New England Conservatory. Among other ballets, he produced Anna Karenina, based on Tolstoy's novel with music by Sydney Cahan, who was also Russakoff's class pianist of many years. During World War II Russakoff worked for the USO.
