= Charlie Becker (actor) =

German-American actor (1887–1968)

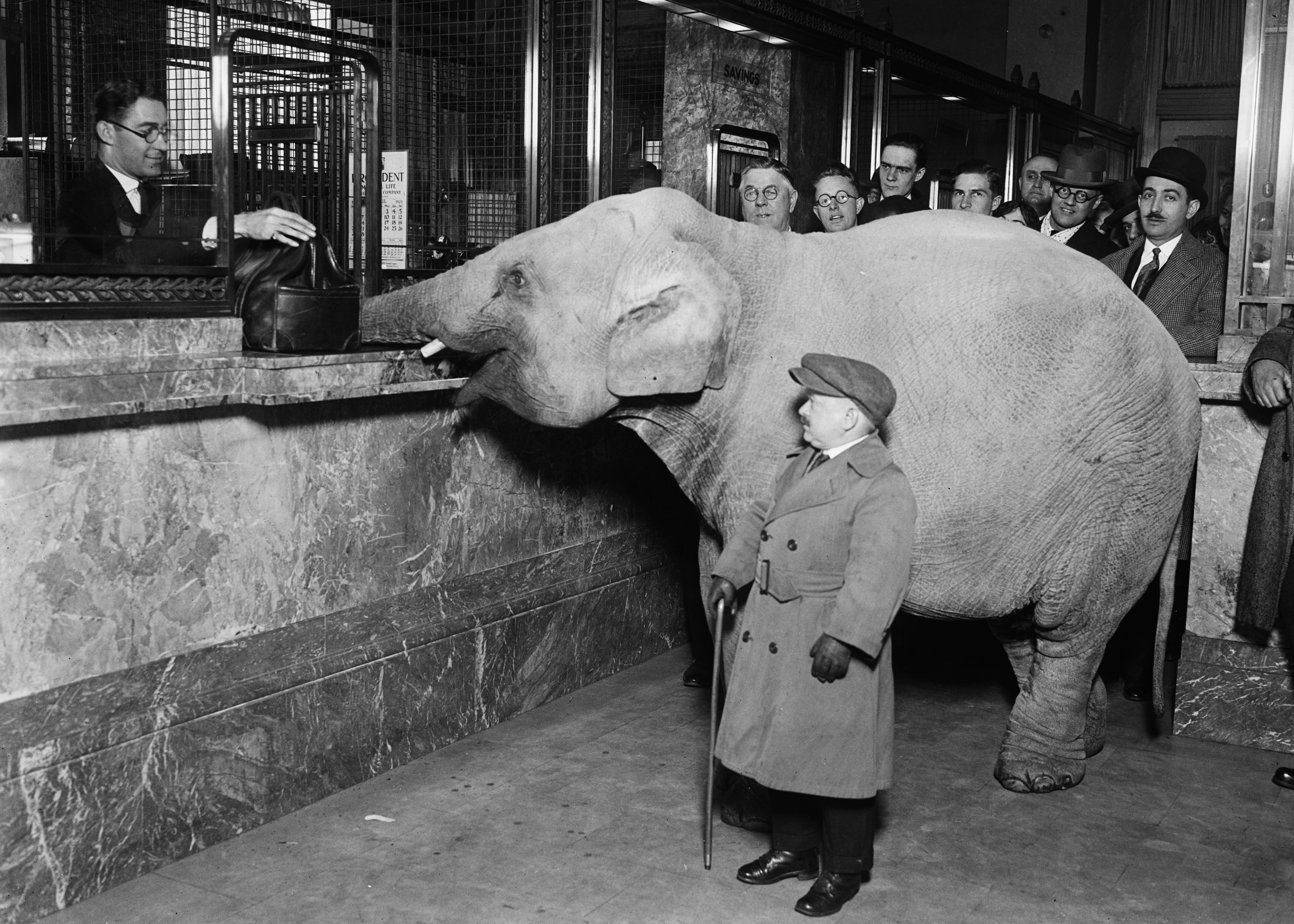
- Becker walked the smallest elephant of his troupe to Merchant's Bank, and made a deposit for Keith's Theatre, 1924
- Born: Karl Becker; November 24, 1887; Muschenheim, Hessen, Germany
- Died: December 28, 1968 (aged 81); Elk Grove, California, United States
- Occupation: Actor
- Years active: 1926–1939
- Spouse: Jessie Kelley (m. 1940; died 1968)

Karl Becker (November 24, 1887 – December 28, 1968), billed as Charlie Becker, was a German American actor. He was 3'9" in height, and is best known for appearing as the Mayor of Munchkinland in The Wizard of Oz (1939). Billy Bletcher dubbed the Mayor's vocals in the film.

== Biography ==
Becker was born near Frankfurt, Germany, in the town of Muschenheim. As a teenager, he worked as a butcher, but often struggled to use the knives and other equipment, and was ridiculed by his fellow workers. When he was about 19, he began performing in travelling "midget shows", and eventually joined the Singer Midgets, a famous troupe led by Leo Singer of Austria. The Singer Midgets moved to the United States during World War I, and became popular on the vaudeville circuits. Becker became friends with George Burns, Will Rogers, and other stars of the time.

Becker appeared in a few films during the 1920s and 1930s. These included Spangles (1926), The Terror of Tiny Town (1938), and, most notably, The Wizard of Oz (1939), in which he played the Mayor of Munchkinland. He was chosen for the role because of his large belly, round face, and facial hair, which were thought to be mayoral features. Because of his thick German accent, however, his voice had to be dubbed. On the set of The Wizard of Oz, Becker met his future wife, Jessie Kelley, who played another Munchkin. She was originally from Mahaska, Kansas. The two married in 1940, moved to Washington, Kansas for a short time and later settled in California, where they sometimes worked as stand-ins for child actors. Later in his life, Becker opened his own sausage business.

Becker died of a stroke in California at the end of 1968. His interment (and his wife's) was in Lone Tree Cemetery in Fairview, near Hayward. Some controversy emerged in 1984 when obituaries for the actor Prince Denis stated that he had played the Mayor of Munchkinland. In reality, Denis had played the Sergeant-at-Arms.

== Honours ==
In 2007, all 124 Munchkin actors in Oz were honoured with a Star on the Hollywood Walk of Fame. For Becker this was a posthumous honour. Seven surviving Munchkin actors attended the ceremony: Mickey Carroll, Ruth Duccini, Jerry Maren, Margaret Pellegrini, Meinhardt Raabe, Karl Slover and Clarence Swensen.

== Filmography ==
Year	Title	Role	Notes
1926	Spangles	Little Tommy Tumtack - Dwarf	
1937	All Over Town	Bit Part	Uncredited
1938	The Terror of Tiny Town	The Cook (Otto)	
1939	The Wizard of Oz	Munchkin Mayor	Uncredited, final film role

His performances in All Over Town and The Wizard of Oz were uncredited.
