= Jakob "Jackie" Gerlich =

Austrian-born American actor and circus entertainer (1925–1960)

- Born: Leo Fuks; September 21, 1925; Vienna, Austria
- Died: December 27, 1960 (aged 35); Sarasota, Florida, U.S.
- Occupations: Actor; circus entertainer
- Years active: 1938–1939
- Notable work: The Wizard of Oz; East Side of Heaven; Terror Of Tiny Town
- Awards: Hollywood Walk of Fame

Jakob Gerlich (September 21, 1925 – December 27, 1960) was an Austrian-born American actor and circus entertainer with dwarfism.

== Early life ==
Jakob Gerlich was born as Leo Fuks to Ashkenazi Jewish parents in Vienna on September 21, 1925. Gerlich was the third son of Regina and Abraham Fox. He was a circus entertainer most notable for his appearance in the 1939 American film The Wizard of Oz.

Gerlich emigrated to America when he arrived in New York City on the S.S. President Roosevelt ocean liner on March 2, 1936, at the age of 10 years old as a member of the "Singer Midgets" group run by Leo Singer. In order to emigrate at such a young age, his older brother's name, Jakob, and identification were used, without his parents' consent, claiming he was born in 1917. He used the name 'Jackie' from then on. Even in other online sources today, he is credited with the name Jakob Gerlich. He worked as a clown and eventually became part of the Ringling Bros. and Barnum & Bailey Circus.

== Wizard of Oz ==
Gerlich is most notable for being in The Wizard of Oz, where he played the red member of the Lollipop Guild. Jerry Maren and Harry Doll were the other two members of the Lollipop Guild in the film. He was only 14 years old when he made his acting break in The Wizard of Oz, three years after arriving in the United States.

Leopold von Singer was the manager of an entertainment troupe called The Singer Midgets and signed a contract with Metro-Goldwyn-Mayer to provide 124 proportionately-sized little people to play Munchkins in Oz. Gerlich was recruited because of his dwarfism and was paid $125 a week for his work. Though Gerlich is uncredited in the film, his name appears in Oz trivia articles and books.

Maren said that due to previous engagements, the three members of the Lollipop guild did not stay in contact after Oz. In 2013 he stated "We pretty much separated because they all had previous engagements. Somebody had to go to Milwaukee, somebody had to go to Boston, New York, etc."

== Other roles ==
Gerlich's first acting experience was in Jed Buell's 1938 American Western The Terror Of Tiny Town, the world's only Western with an all-midget cast. Jakob was a part of the troupe of actors formerly called the Singer Midgets that Buell renamed Jed Buell's Midgets.

Another acting experience was also an uncredited role when he played Bobby in the 1939 film East Side of Heaven.

Besides his small movie roles, Gerlich was a circus performer in the Ringling Bros. and Barnum & Bailey Circus.

Gerlich was interviewed by Mike Wallace on May 1, 1959.

== Death and legacy ==
On December 27, 1960, Gerlich died in Sarasota, Florida, at the age of 35.

In 2007, all 124 Munchkin actors in Oz were honored with a Star on the Hollywood Walk of Fame. For Gerlich this was a posthumous honor. Seven surviving Munchkin actors attended the ceremony, including Mickey Carroll, Jerry Maren, Margaret Pellegrini, Meinhardt Raabe, Karl Slover and Clarence Swensen.
