= Matina Brothers =

Entertainers

The Matina Brothers (a.k.a. Matina Midget Troupe) were an American trio of entertainers known for their short height. Lajos, Bela, and Matyus were brothers who immigrated to the US together from the Kingdom of Hungary. Cast as Munchkins in The Wizard of Oz, they were nicknamed Leo, Mike, and Ike, respectively, during production, and listed in the credits with the surname 'Rogers'. (Note: Except Leo, who was credited simply as "Leo".) Bela and Matyus currently hold the world record for the "shortest twins" at just 76 cm (30 in) each.

== History ==
Lajos Matina, the eldest, was born in Hungary on September 12, 1893, followed by twin brothers Bela and Matyus in 1901. The trio of brothers later moved to America where they became naturalized American citizens. The brothers soon joined a troupe which was led by an individual named Prince Ludwig who dubbed them the "Matina Midget Troupe". In 1915, Lajos married Elise Broek who was a suffragette.

Each brother played a Munchkin villager in the 1939 film The Wizard of Oz, where Bela was billed as "Mike Rogers" (Matina), and Matyus "Ike Rogers" (Matina). Lajos also became known as "Leo" Matina while working beside his brothers "Mike" and "Ike". In his biography of Daisy and Violet Hilton, Dean Jensen reported that the Matina twins became very popular in America to such an extent that the candy Mike and Ike, which first appeared in 1940, was named after them.

The brothers continued in show business after the movie, and Leo eventually filled in as a chef for the troupe. The first brother to pass away was Mike Matina (Bela), who died on June 1, 1954. Matyus "Ike" Matina died on September 14, 1965, and Lajos "Leo" Matina on December 14, 1975.

== Controversy ==
Bela, and Matyus ("Mike & Ike") were described as problem drinkers, who tried to get fellow Munchkins to share in their overindulgence while the Wizard of Oz was in production (it is unclear if this was done on or off site). In a 1967 interview, Judy Garland referred to all of the Munchkins as "little drunks" who got intoxicated every night to the point where they had to be picked up in "butterfly nets". These accusations were denied as fabrications by fellow Munchkin Margaret Pellegrini, who said only "a couple of kids from Germany even drank beer".

== See also ==
- List of the verified shortest people
