= Midget =

Offensive term for a person of unusually short stature

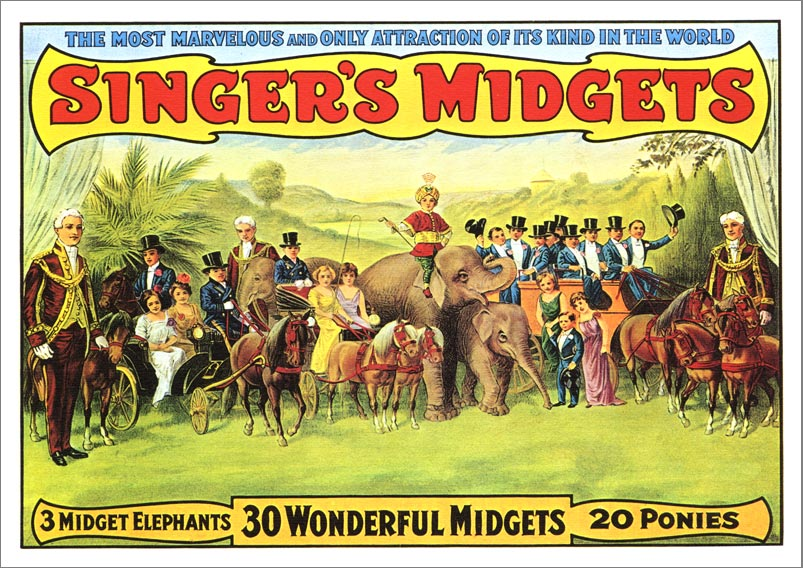
Singer's Midgets toured the US from 1910 to 1935 and were "enormously successful".

Midget (from midge, a tiny biting insect) is a term for a person of unusually short stature that is considered by some to be pejorative due to its etymology. While not a medical term like dwarf (for a person with dwarfism, a medical condition with a number of causes, most often achondroplasia), midget long described anyone, or any animal, exhibiting proportionate dwarfism. The word has a history of association with the performing arts, as little people were often employed by acts in the circus, professional wrestling and vaudeville.

The term may also refer to anything of much smaller than normal size, as a synonym for "miniature" or "mini", such as midget cell, midget crabapple, midget flowerpecker, midget submarine, MG Midget, Daihatsu Midget, and the Midget Mustang airplane; or to anything that regularly uses anything that is smaller than normal (other than a person), such as midget car racing and quarter midget racing.

"Midget" may also refer to a smaller version of play or participation, such as midget golf; or to anything designed for very young (i.e., small) participants—in many cases children—such as Disneyland's Midget Autopia, midget hockey, and midget football. Some sports organizations, like Hockey Canada, have committed to removing the word, recognizing that it might be considered offensive.

== History ==
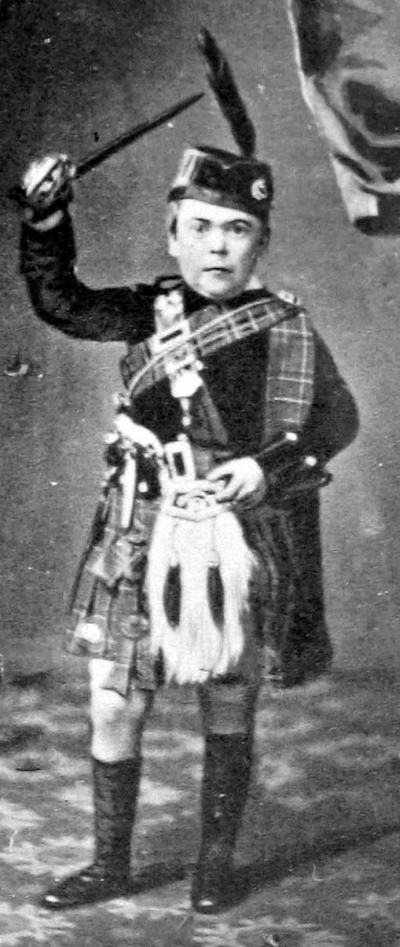
Charles Sherwood Stratton as "General Tom Thumb" circa 1861 (under P.T. Barnum)

Merriam-Webster states that the first use of the term "midget" was in 1816. Midgets have always been popular entertainers but were often regarded with disgust and revulsion in society. In the early 19th century, midgets were romanticized by the middle class and regarded with the same affectionate condescension extended to children, as creatures of innocence. The term "midget" came into prominence in the mid-19th century after Harriet Beecher Stowe used it in her novels Sunny Memories of Foreign Lands and Old Town Folks where she described children and an extremely short man, respectively. P. T. Barnum helped popularize the term "midget" when he began featuring General Tom Thumb, Lavinia Warren and Commodore Nutt in his circus. "Midget" became linked to referring to short people put on public display for curiosity and sport. Barnum's midgets reached position of high society, given fantasy military titles, introduced to dignitaries and royalty, and showered with gifts.

Such performances continued to be widespread through the middle part of the twentieth century, with Hermines Midgets brought from their performances in Paris to appear at the 1939 New York World's Fair, the same year that MGM released The Wizard of Oz, which featured 124 little people in its cast, most of whom were from the Singer's Midgets troupe.

=== Controversy ===
When interviewed for a 1999 piece, performers engaged in midget wrestling stated that they did not view the term as derogatory but merely descriptive of their small size. Others disagreed, with one stating that the performances themselves perpetuated an outdated and demeaning image.

Towards the end of the 20th century, some people began to consider the term pejorative when referring to people with dwarfism. Others, such as actor Hervé Villechaize, continued to self-identify as "midgets".

There have been movements to remove the use of the word "midget" from age classification categories in youth sports, with Hockey Canada announcing that it would refer to the division as "U18" in 2020 as part of a wider renaming scheme.

In the United Kingdom, Liverpool Hope University academic Dr. Erin Pritchard complained that the word midget, considering its etymology and use as a slur (often referred to by people with dwarfism as "the M-word"), was offensive to people with dwarfism and campaigned to have it removed from the name of the confection Midget Gems. Marks & Spencer became the first retailer to rename their product, adopting the name Mini Gems. Other brands started to follow suit over the following months and years. Dr. Pritchard then petitioned to have the Midget pub in Abingdon-on-Thames—named after a vehicle produced by MG Cars, which was formerly based locally—renamed. In 2024, the pub's owners, Greene King, renamed it the Roaring Raindrop, after another MG Cars model. However, this decision was controversial and led to a counter-petition to keep the old name.

== Mascots ==
As of 2025, at least four high schools in the United States continue to use midget as a school mascot.

- Freeburg Community High School (Illinois)
- Estherville Lincoln Central High School (Iowa)
- Putnam County High School (Unionville, Missouri)
- Butternut High School (Butternut, Wisconsin)

In 2015, the McLaughlin, South Dakota School District, which stands on the Standing Rock Sioux Reservation, changed the name of their school's mascot after protests came from Little People of America. The school's basketball coach, an alumnus and proponent of the change, drew comparisons to the Native American mascot controversy.

In 2019, Hurley High School in Wisconsin changed its Mascot from midgets to the Northstars. In 2025, a Iowa State Senator Molly Donohue introduced a bill to prohibit schools receiving state aid, including Estherville Lincoln, from using "discriminary mascots" including midgets. Also in 2025, an advocacy filed a federal discrimination complaint with the U.S. Department of Education against the St. Clair County school district over the mascot at Freeburg High School. State Rep. Maurice West submitted a bill to the Illinois House of Representatives that would ban the mascot by 2028. The House passed the bill on April 8, 2025. A similar bill was introduced in the Missouri House of Representatives.

In March 2025, after a long history of attempts, Dickinson High School (Dickinson, North Dakota) announced that it would be retiring the mascot at the end of the year. School officials cited concerns about students feeling uncomfortable with the name and legal risks of discrimination against disabled people.

== See also ==
- List of dwarfism organisations
- Dwarf-tossing
- Midgetville
- Singer's Midgets
- Midgets vs. Mascots
- Pygmy peoples
- Munchkin
- Oompa Loompa
- Leprechaun
- Dwarf
- Elf
- Santa's elves
