= Raia =

Raia, RAIA, or RaiA may refer to:

- A raia or la raia, alternative names for the Portugal–Spain border in other languages
- Raia, alternative spelling of Raja, a genus of rays in the family Rajidae
- Raia, alternative spelling of Raya (country subdivision), a subdivision in some parts of the Ottoman Empire
- Raia, Goa, a small village in Goa, India
- Kamen Rider Raia, a character from Kamen Rider Ryuki
- Raia (surname)
- Royal Australian Institute of Architects (RAIA), a professional body for architects in Australia
- Ribosome-associated inhibitor A, a hibernation factor protein
