= Dahmer vs. Gacy =

2010 American comedy horror film

- Promotional release poster
- Directed by: Ford Austin
- Screenplay by: Andrew J. Rausch
- Story by: Chris Watson
- Produced by: Chris Watson
- Starring: Ethan Phillips; Art LaFleur; Irwin Keyes; Randal Malone
- Cinematography: Orestes Gonzales
- Edited by: Steve Anderson
- Music by: Jeff Doiron
- Distributed by: Angry Baby Monkey Pictures
- Release date: April 24, 2010 (Bare Bones)
- Running time: 90 minutes
- Country: United States
- Language: English

Dahmer vs. Gacy is a 2010 American comedy horror film directed by Ford Austin and written by Andrew J. Rausch. The film won the Audience Award at the 2010 Bare Bones International Film Festival.

== Plot ==
A secret government lab run by Dr. Stravinsky has been trying to create the ultimate killer using the DNA of infamous serial killers Jeffrey Dahmer and John Wayne Gacy. However, the two escape, and go on a killing spree across the United States. Trying to stop the maniacs is Ringo, a hick warrior being trained by God and armed with a shotgun and a bottle of whiskey; along with his own demons, Ringo faces an army of Japanese ninjas and a super serial killer.

== Cast ==
- Peter Zhmutski as Dr. Stravinsky
- Ethan Phillips as X-13
- Art LaFleur as Dr. Hess
- Irwin Keyes as Dr. Pruitt
- Randal Malone as John Wayne Gacy
- Ford Austin as Jeffrey Dahmer
- Jerry Maren as Mime
- Felissa Rose as Joanie Farana
- Steven Adler as Stevie
- Katie Lohmann as Valerie Winters
- Brooke Lewis as Tammy Hart
- Harland Williams as God
- Del Howison as Bum
- Debbie Rochon as Female Hitchhiker
- Rachel Reynolds as Ninja 1
- Jed Rowen as Sergeant Pollard
- David Stay as Rob Phillips
- Bonnie Aarons as General Arbogas
- Elissa Dowling as Jezebel, The Hitcher
- George Reynolds as Police Chief Bellagio
- Anya Benton as Daisy Daniels
- Alana Curry as Holly Richards
- Marc Wasserman as Boz Hasseldorf
- Deron Miller as Charles Manson
- Jamie Carson as Melanie Potter
- Wade Stanton as Richard Scarries
- Trey Alexander as Hal Anderson

== Production ==
=== Filming ===
Parts of the film were shot in Toluca Lake, Echo Park and Hollywood, Los Angeles.

== Soundtrack ==
1. Enuff Z'Nuff — "Roll Me"
2. Enuff Z'Nuff — "Can't Wait"
3. The Seventh Triangle — "Dead End Job"
4. Enuff Z'Nuff — "You & I"
5. Jason Peri — "Honey Bee"
6. Enuff Z'Nuff — "Everything Works If You Let It"
7. Enuff Z'Nuff — "Rock 'n World"
8. Enuff Z'Nuff — "Z'overture"
9. Enuff Z'Nuff — "Wheels"

== Reception ==
Tony Vilgotsky of Darker rated the movie highly, adding that the plot should not be taken seriously.
