= Debbie Lee Carrington =

American actress (1959–2018)

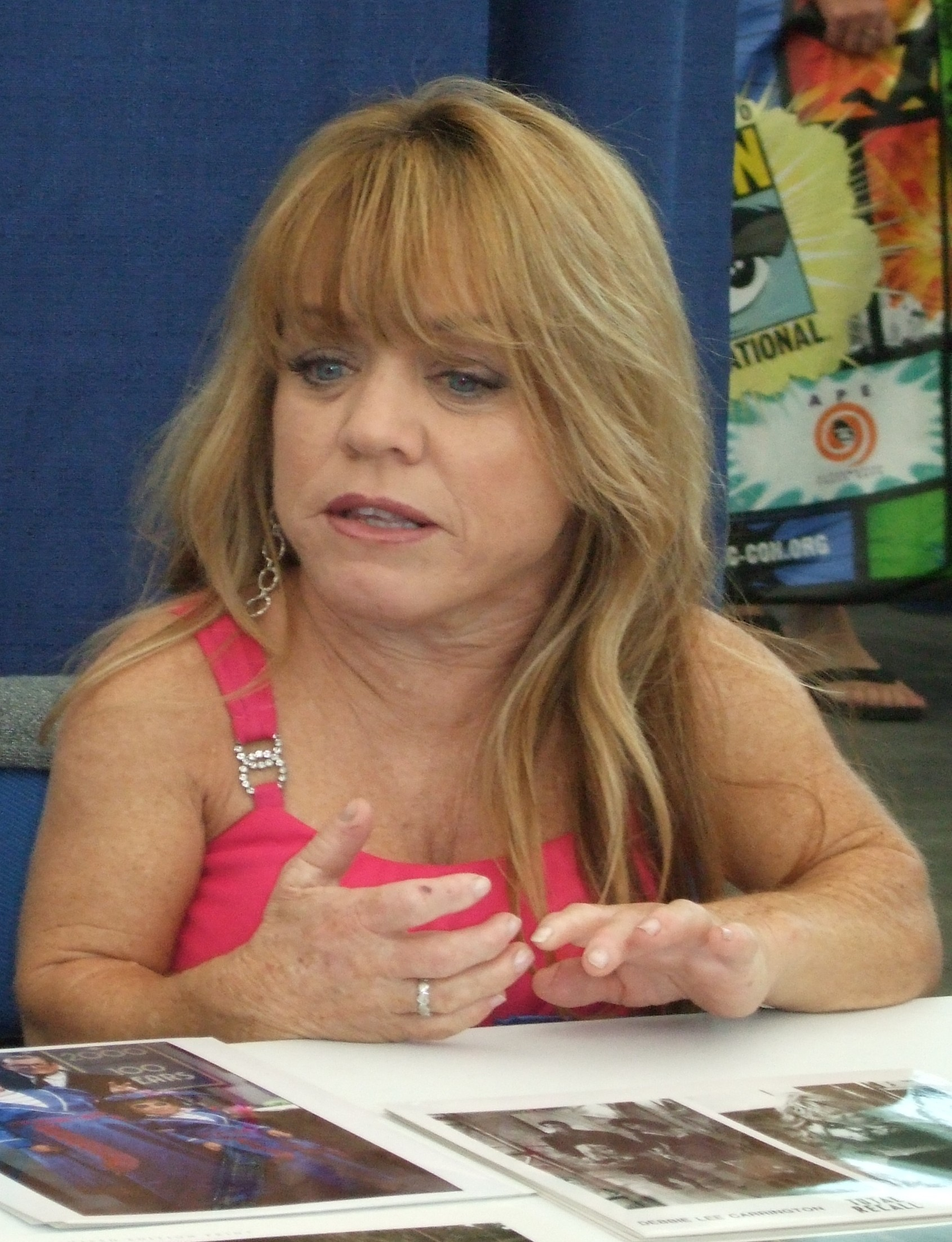
- Carrington in 2010
- Born: Deborah Lee Carrington; December 14, 1959; San Jose, California, U.S.
- Died: March 23, 2018 (aged 58); Pleasanton, California, U.S.
- Occupations: Actress; stuntwoman
- Years active: 1981–2018

Deborah Lee Carrington (December 14, 1959 – March 23, 2018) was an American actress and stuntwoman. Her best known movie roles include playing a Martian rebel in Total Recall, an Ewok in Return of the Jedi (and in subsequent TV movies) and an elf in The Polar Express.

Carrington's film career began in college when she replied to an ad for extras in a newsletter published by Little People of America for Under the Rainbow, a film about the Munchkins from The Wizard of Oz.

== Early life and career ==
Carrington was born in San Jose, California. She had a brother, Robert, and sister, Kathy. In 1981 she answered a casting call for Under The Rainbow while attending college at University of California, Davis. She took a break from her studies after landing a role in the film, but later returned and earned a degree in early childhood development.

Carrington appeared in many films and TV shows, including Total Recall, In Living Color, The Drew Carey Show, Howard the Duck, Tracey Takes On..., Men in Black, Seinfeld, Baywatch, Married... with Children, Boston Legal, The Garbage Pail Kids Movie, Dexter, and Bones. In 2008, she filmed scenes for the action thriller Bitch Slap. She also performed as a stunt double—often for child actors and dolls that had come to life—in films like Titanic and the Child's Play slasher film series.

Carrington was born with dwarfism and said she had experienced prejudicial attitudes as a dwarf in Hollywood. She supported other dwarf actors, insisting that they received credit for their work, since many costume-specific parts often went uncredited.

By the 1990s, Carrington began to push back against being typecast in costume-only roles. On television, she played character roles like Tiny Avenger on In Living Color, Tammy in Seinfeld, and Doreen in The Drew Carey Show. Additionally, in 1990, she was photographed by Peter Lindbergh for Vogue Italia with supermodel Helena Christensen.

== Death ==
Carrington died on March 23, 2018, at age 58 in her parents' home in Pleasanton, California following a period of health complications.

== Filmography ==
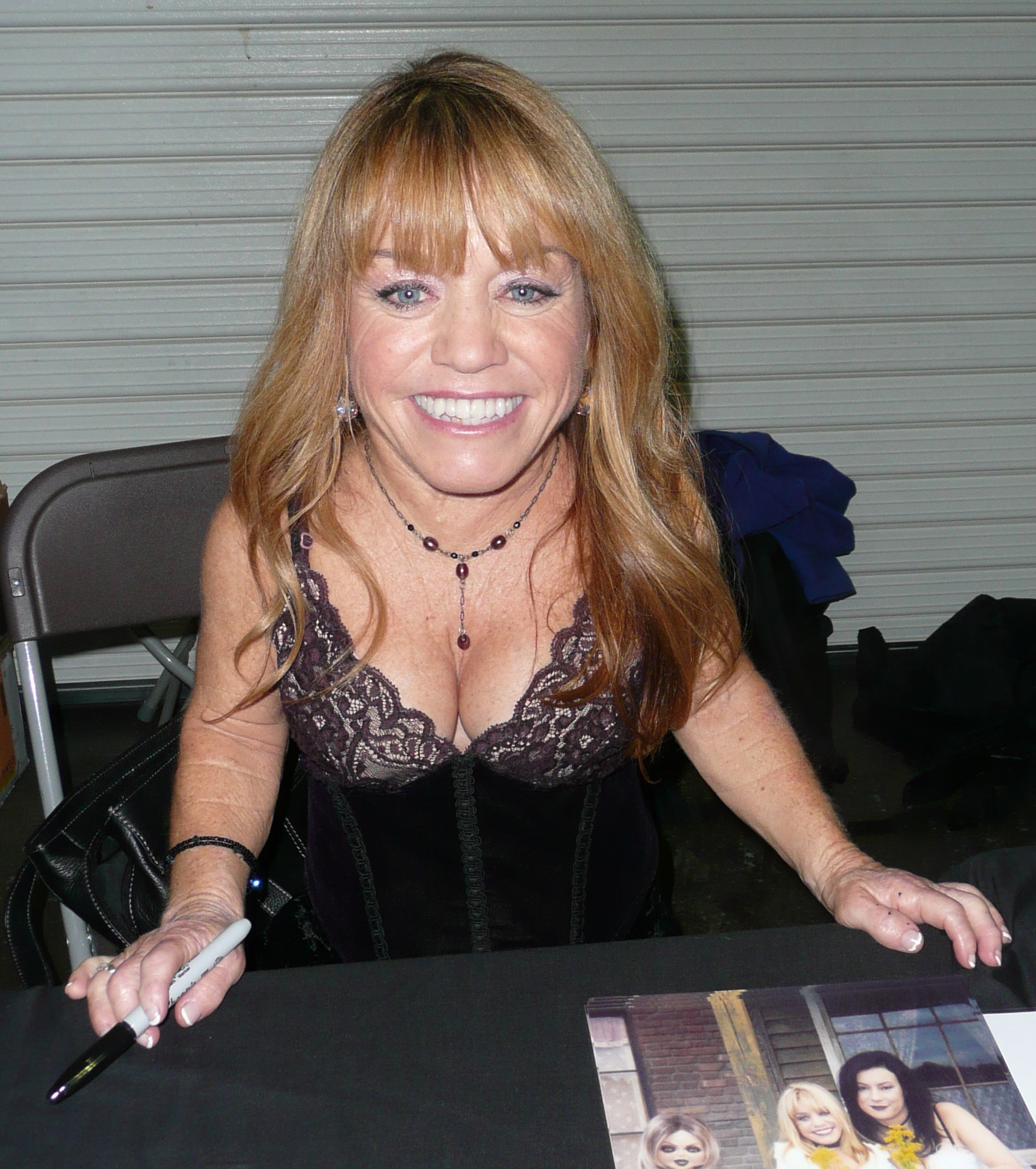
Debbie Lee Carrington at a convention in London, 2011.

=== Film ===
Year	Title	Role	Notes
1981	Under the Rainbow	Hotel Rainbow Guest	
1983	Return of the Jedi	Romba Ewok	
1984	Earthlings	Zet	TV movie
1984	The Ewok Adventure	Weechee	TV movie
1985	Ewoks: The Battle for Endor	Weechee	TV movie
1986	Invaders from Mars	Drone	
1986	Howard the Duck	Duck	
1986	Captain EO	Idee	Short
1987	Harry and the Hendersons	Little Bigfoot	
1987	The Garbage Pail Kids Movie	Valerie Vomit	
1989	Nerds of a Feather	Little Army of Little Russian Soldiers	
1990	Spaced Invaders	Dr. Ziplock	
1990	Total Recall	Thumbelina	
1990	Club Fed	Betty	
1990	The Bonfire of the Vanities	Crying Midget	
1992	Seedpeople	Tumbler	
1992	Batman Returns	Emperor Penguin	
1992	Mom and Dad Save the World	Bwaaa (Fishface)	
1992	Cattive ragazze	Amy	
1994	The High Crusade	Branithar	
1995	Born to Be Wild	Gorilla Team	
1997	Men in Black	Alien Father	
1998	Mighty Joe Young	Other Gorilla	
1999	She's All That	Felicity	
2000	The Independent	Surfer Girl	
2000	The Christmas Secret	Gorah	TV movie
2003	Tiptoes	Kitty Katz	
2003	Scary Movie 3	Mini Tabitha	
2004	The Polar Express	Elf (voice)	
2004	Seed of Chucky	Herself	
2004	Big Time	Gizzie Blunderbore	Short
2006	Sunstroke	Receptionist	Short
2008	Bedtime Stories	Booing Goblin	
2009	Bitch Slap	"Hot Pocket"	
2017	Special Unit	Sophie	

=== Television ===
Year	Title	Role	Notes
1985	What's Happening Now!!	Munchkin	Episode: "The Improbable Dream"
1985	Amazing Stories	Alien	Episode: "Fine Tuning"
1989	Monsters	Troll	Episode: "Fools' Gold"
1990	Married... with Children	Alien	Episode: "Married... with Aliens"
1990	WIOU	Carla Sapper	Episode: "Do the Wrong Thing"
1991	The New Adam-12	Cindy	Episode: "Trick or Trick"
1991–92	In Living Color	Tiny Avenger	Recurring Cast: Season 3
1993	Tales from the Crypt	Circus Performer	Episode: "Food for Thought"
1994	Seinfeld	Tammy	Episode: "The Stand In"
1994	Baywatch	Debbie	Episode: "Silent Night, Baywatch Night: Part 1 & 2"
1998	Tracey Takes On...	Raquel Gibson	Episode: "Loss"
1998	The Journey of Allen Strange	Meetra	Episode: "Haunted"
1999–00	The Drew Carey Show	Doreen	Recurring Cast: Season 5
2000	Buffy the Vampire Slayer	Creature	Episode: "Listening to Fear"
2001	The Lone Gunmen	Sadie	Episode: "Madam, I'm Adam"
2002	ER	Ginger Jones	Episodes: "A Simple Twist of Fate"
2002	Philly	Stephanie Renato	Episode: "Tall Tales"
2002	The District	Alice	Episode: "Small Packages"
2004	Boston Legal	Patty	Episode: "Loose Lips"
2004	Huff	Marla	Episode: "Flashpants"
2006	Dexter	Patty	Episode: "Truth Be Told"
2006	Nip/Tuck	Merrily	Episode: "Reefer"
2008	Men in Trees	Karen	Episode: "Read Between the Minds"
2009	Bones	Gidget Jones	Episode: "The Dwarf in the Dirt"
2011	Jessie	Jingles	Episode: "Christmas Story"
2011–13	Pair of Kings	Squonk Queen	Guest Cast: Season 2-3
2012	The New Normal	Little Person Mom	Episode: "Pilot"
2012	See Dad Run	Brenda	Episode: "See Dad Lose Janie"
2016	Grace and Frankie	Tina Marie	Episode: "The Party"

=== Music video ===
Year	Artist	Song	Role
1989	Aerosmith	"Love in an Elevator"	Dwarf Woman
