= Margaret Raia =

American actress

- Born: 1928; Long Island, New York, U.S.
- Died: August 17, 2003 (aged 75); Port Richey, Florida, U.S.
- Occupation: Actress
- Relatives: Matthew Raia (brother); Agrippina (sister)

Margaret Raia (1928 – August 17, 2003), also known as Margie Raia, was an American actress with dwarfism, best known for her role as one of the Munchkin villagers in the 1939 film The Wizard of Oz.

== Early life ==
Raia was born in Long Island, New York in 1928 as one of the four children of Italian immigrants Emanuel and Maria Raia. She and her brother, Matthew, who also had dwarfism, worked in carnival sideshows as children. The two became acquainted with Leo Singer, who eventually got them their acting roles.

== Career ==
At age 10, Raia played a munchkin villager in The Wizard of Oz. During production, MGM officials discovered that Raia was underage and as a result she was expelled from the set halfway through filming. Her brother Matthew also appeared in the film, as Munchkinland's City Father.

== Later life ==
In the late 1980s Raia moved to Port Richey, Florida with her sister, Agrippina, and Agrippina's husband John J. Santiago. Raia remained close with her sister and Santiago, and helped Santiago care for her sister after she developed Alzheimer's.

On August 17, 2003, Raia died from a brain seizure in Port Richey at the age of 75.

== See also ==
- Munchkin cast in the Wizard of Oz (1939)
