= Tiny Troubles =

1939 American film by George Sidney

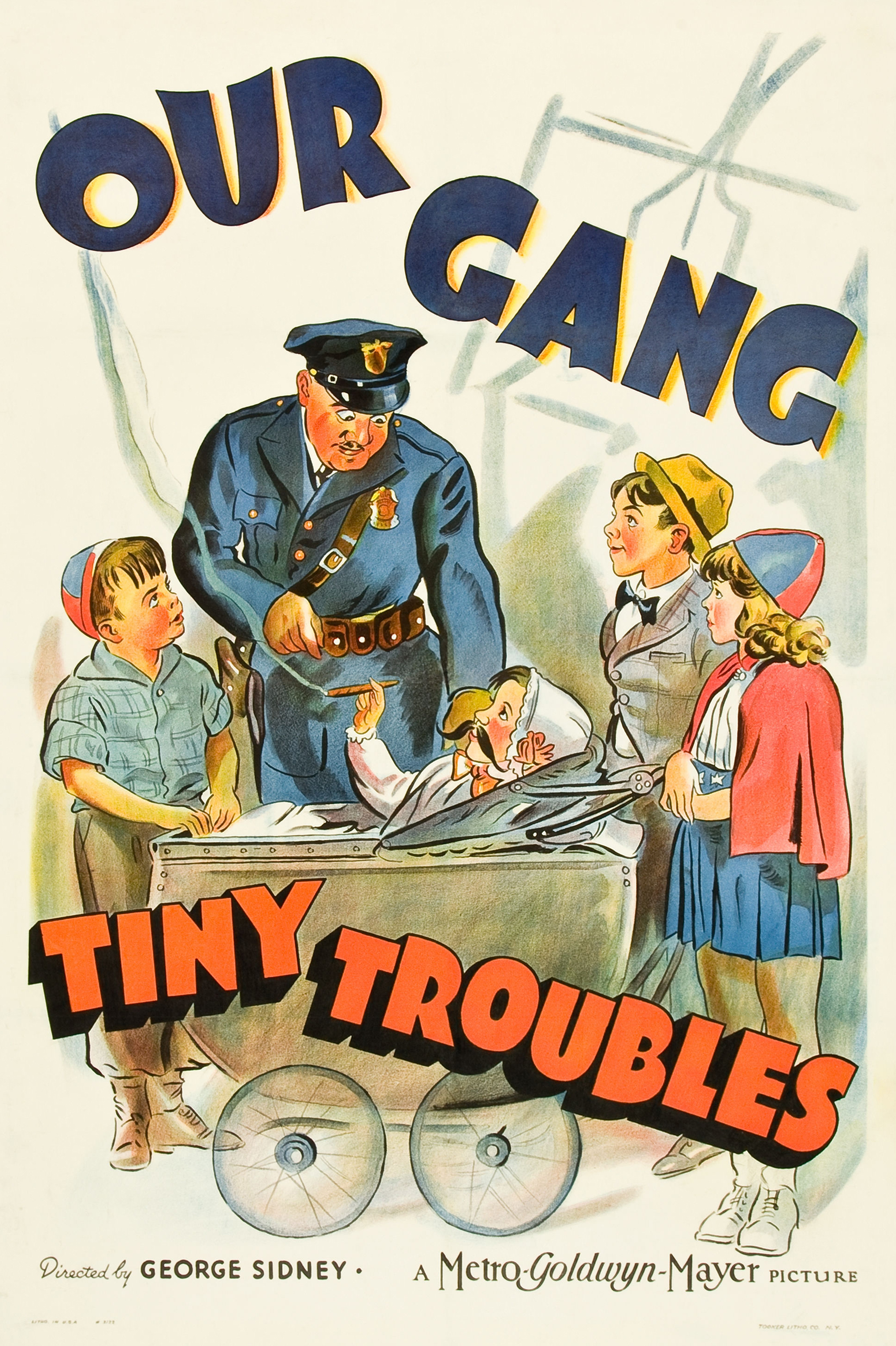
- Directed by: George Sidney
- Written by: Hal Law; Robert A. McGowan
- Produced by: Jack Chertok
- Starring: George McFarland; Carl Switzer; Darla Hood; Eugene Lee; Billie Thomas; Jerry Maren; Edward Marazoni; Jimmy Marazoni; Barbara Bedford; Fred Kelsey
- Cinematography: Alfred Gilks
- Distributed by: Metro-Goldwyn-Mayer
- Release date: February 18, 1939
- Running time: 10:18
- Country: United States
- Language: English

Tiny Troubles is a 1939 Our Gang short comedy film directed by George Sidney. It was the 176th Our Gang short to be released.

== Plot ==
Alfalfa has a loud crying baby brother that he wants to get rid of. When out with the gang he sees what he thinks is a baby in a carriage. He puts his baby brother in that carriage and takes this "baby" back home. But the baby happens to be a midget who lives a life of crime named "Lightfingered Lester". Lester initially plays along but causes all sorts of havoc soon after including drinking beer, taunting the gang, and attempting to rob the house. Someone else finds the baby and brings him to the police station. The police then raid Alfalfa's home and take the gang in when they find Lester there. They are all taken in. They send Lester back to jail while giving the gang probation.

== Cast ==
=== The Gang ===
- Carl Switzer as Alfalfa Switzer
- Darla Hood as Darla
- Eugene Lee as Porky
- George McFarland as Spanky
- Billie Thomas as Buckwheat

=== Additional cast ===
- Barbara Bedford as Mrs. Switzer, Alfalfa's mother
- Fred Kelsey as Police chief
- Jerry Marenghi as Light Fingered Lester
- Sue Moore as Myrtle
- Emory Parnell as Officer Clancy
- Lee Phelps as Officer O'Brien

== Critical reception ==
In the book The Little Rascals: The Life and Times of Our Gang, film critic Leonard Maltin commented that Tiny Troubles is a "shapeless reworking" of 1929's Bouncing Babies consisting of "woefully thin stuff". He added that the film "represents the first really bad MGM Our Gang short" and that "somehow the [MGM] production staff expected an audience to swallow the idea that 11-year-old Alfalfa and 10-year-old Spanky couldn't tell the difference between an infant and a midget dressed as one." Maltin concluded by saying "embarrassment replaces laughter."

== See also ==
- Our Gang filmography
