= Betty Ann Bruno =

American reporter and television host (1931–2023)

- Born: Betty Ann Cain; October 1, 1931; Wahiawa, Hawaii, U.S.
- Died: July 30, 2023 (aged 91); Sonoma, California, U.S.
- Education: Stanford University
- Occupations: Actress; journalist
- Spouse: Craig Scheiner
- Children: 3
- Awards: 3 Emmy Awards

Betty Ann Bruno (née Cain; October 1, 1931 – July 30, 2023) was an American child actress and journalist. She started her journalist career as a political talk show television producer and host and was an investigative reporter who worked for KTVU-Channel 2 in San Francisco for over 20 years, retiring in 1992.

== Early life and education ==
Betty Ann Cain was born on October 1, 1931, in Wahiawa, Hawaii, but grew up in Hollywood, California. She was the daughter of a Hawaiian–Chinese mother and a Dutch–Irish father. She was a Stanford University graduate.

== Career ==
As a child, Bruno appeared in the 1939 film The Wizard of Oz as one of the Munchkins. Before that she had a bit role in John Ford's 1937 film The Hurricane. Her work in television won her three Emmy Awards. After retiring from television in 1992, she became a hula dance instructor. In 2020, she published her autobiography, The Munchkin Diary: My Personal Yellow Brick Road. She appeared on television once again in an episode of To Tell the Truth which was broadcast in May 2022.

== Personal life and death ==
Bruno lived in California, was married to Craig Scheiner, a former KTVU photographer, and had three sons. She was reported in media as one of the few surviving cast members from The Wizard of Oz.

Bruno died from a heart attack on July 30, 2023, in Sonoma, California, at the age of 91.

== Filmography ==
Title	Year	Role	Director
The Hurricane	1937		John Ford
The Wizard of Oz	1939	Munchkin	Victor Fleming
To Tell the Truth	2022	Herself	
