= Raia (surname) =

Raia is a surname. Notable people with the surname include:

- Andrew Raia (born 1968), American politician
- Cláudia Raia (born 1966), Brazilian actress
- Joey Raia, American mix engineer
- Margaret Raia (1929–2003), American actress
- Moxie Raia, a.k.a. Laura Raia, (born 1990), American singer-songwriter
- Silvano Raia (1930–2026), Brazilian surgeon
