= Olga C. Nardone =

American actress (1921–2010)

- Born: Olga Nida Carmena Nardone; June 8, 1921; Newton, Massachusetts, U.S.
- Died: September 24, 2010 (aged 89); Nonantum, Massachusetts, U.S.
- Other name: Tiny Olga
- Occupations: Actress; vaudevillian
- Known for: Being one of the last surviving munchkins from the 1939 MGM film The Wizard of Oz

Olga Nida Carmena Nardone (June 8, 1921 – September 24, 2010) was an American actress and one of the last surviving Munchkins from the 1939 film The Wizard of Oz, in which she played a member of the Lullaby League. She was known as "Little Olga" and "Princess Olga" and was one of the smallest of the Wizard of Oz Munchkins, standing at just 3 feet 4 inches (101.6 cm) tall.

== Biography ==
Olga Nida Carmena Nardone was born in Newton, Massachusetts on June 8, 1921, to Louise M. and Leonardo B. Nardone. She danced in vaudeville under the stage name "Tiny Olga" as a duo with her dancing teacher's brother. In 1938, when Olga was 17, her agent convinced her and her sister to audition for The Wizard of Oz. In the film, she plays one of the "Lullaby League" dancers and one of the "Sleepyhead" Munchkins who are seen waking up in a bird's nest.

The Wizard of Oz was her sole screen appearance. After completing the film, she appeared in the 1939 Rose Parade on a float themed to Munchkinland. Following this promotional appearance, Olga returned to Massachusetts, where she resumed her local dancing career, adding a short Oz-themed routine to her act. She lived an ordinary, quiet life thereafter, declining to participate in any fan events or conventions. She died in Nonantum, Massachusetts on September 24, 2010, at the age of 89.
