= Karl Slover =

American actor (1918–2011)

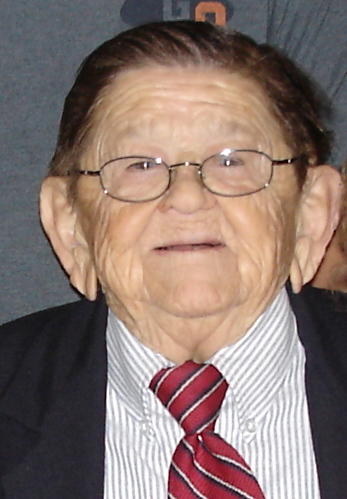
- Slover in June 2006
- Born: Karl Kosiczky; September 21, 1918; Prakfalva, Kingdom of Hungary
- Died: November 15, 2011 (aged 93); Dublin, Georgia, U.S.
- Occupation: Actor
- Years active: 1937–2009

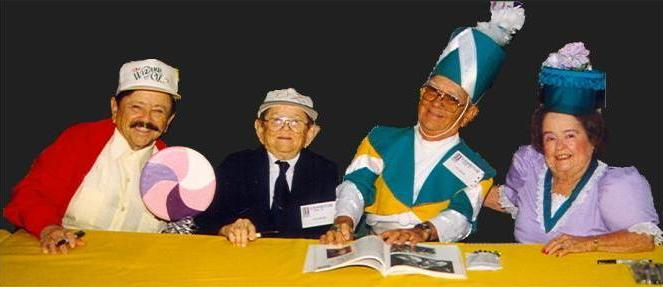
From left: Jerry Maren (Lollipop Guild), Karl Slover, Clarence Swensen and Margaret Pellegrini (1998)

Karl Slover (September 21, 1918 – November 15, 2011) was a Slovak-born American actor best known as one of the Munchkins in The Wizard of Oz (1939). Only three other adult Munchkin performers remained alive at the time of Slover's death.

== Early life ==
Slover was born as Karl Kosiczky on September 21, 1918, in then Prakfalva, Kingdom of Hungary (now Prakovce, Slovakia). Diagnosed at an early age with pituitary dwarfism, Slover was barely two feet tall by his eighth birthday. Dwarfism was not a family trait; his father stood six feet six inches, and his mother was just a few inches shorter. Slover's father went to great lengths to make Slover taller, including taking him to Hungary, where doctors fixed stretchers to his arms and legs.

== Career ==
When Slover was just nine years old, his father sent him to work for a traveling show based out of Berlin, Germany. After working with the show for several years, Slover moved to the United States where he joined another traveling show. It wasn't long before Slover began appearing in films such as The Terror of Tiny Town, Block-Heads, Bringing Up Baby, and They Gave Him a Gun.

Slover was working in Hawaii when his circus manager sent him to Hollywood, where little people were needed for an upcoming film called The Wizard of Oz. At the age of 21 and standing just 4 feet 4 inches, Slover played the parts of four Munchkins in the movie: the first trumpeter, a soldier, one of the sleepy heads, and one among those who sang "Follow the Yellow Brick Road".

His "Oz" co-stars, The Matina Triplets, whose names were Bela "Ike", Lajos "Leo", and Matjus "Mike" were originally from Budapest. They also appeared in the film as Munchkins.

After filming Oz, Slover began working for the 'Original World Famous Singers Midget Show' where he sang and danced throughout the United States. When the show ended in 1942, Slover joined the Royal American Carnival in Tampa, Florida. At this time he took the last name Slover, the last name of his stage manager.

== Later life ==
Slover remained very active in his later years and participated in several celebrations related to The Wizard of Oz. Every June, Slover attended festivities celebrating Judy Garland's birthday at the Judy Garland Museum & Birthplace in Grand Rapids, Minnesota. In November 2007, Slover joined seven other surviving munchkins in Hollywood where honorary mayor Johnny Grant unveiled a star dedicated to the Munchkins on the Hollywood Walk of Fame.

=== Death ===
Slover died on November 15, 2011, at the age of 93. He resided at an assisted living facility in Dublin, Georgia, at the time of his death. His interment was in Rentz's cemetery. At the time of Slover's death, three other Munchkin actors were still alive from Oz: Jerry Maren, Margaret Williams Pellegrini and Ruth Robinson Duccini. He outlived every major cast member.

== Filmography ==
Year	Title	Role	Notes
1937	They Gave Him a Gun	Minor Role	Uncredited
1938	Bringing Up Baby	Midget	Uncredited
1938	Block-Heads	Midget in Elevator	Uncredited
1938	The Terror of Tiny Town	The Barber (Sammy)	as Karl Casitzky
1939	The Wizard of Oz	Munchkin Herald #1/Sleepyhead	Uncredited
1945	The Lost Weekend	Baby	Uncredited
1986	The Laurel and Hardy Show	Midget	Archive footage
1993	We're Off to See the Munchkins		as Karl Slover
1994	I Married a Munchkin	Himself	Uncredited
1999	The Daily Show	Himself	1 episode
2001	Memories of Oz	Himself	as Karl Slover
2005	Entertainment Tonight	Himself	1 episode
2009	Hollywood Celebrates Its Biggest Little Stars!	Himself	as Karl Slover
