= Jerry Maren =

American actor (1920–2018)

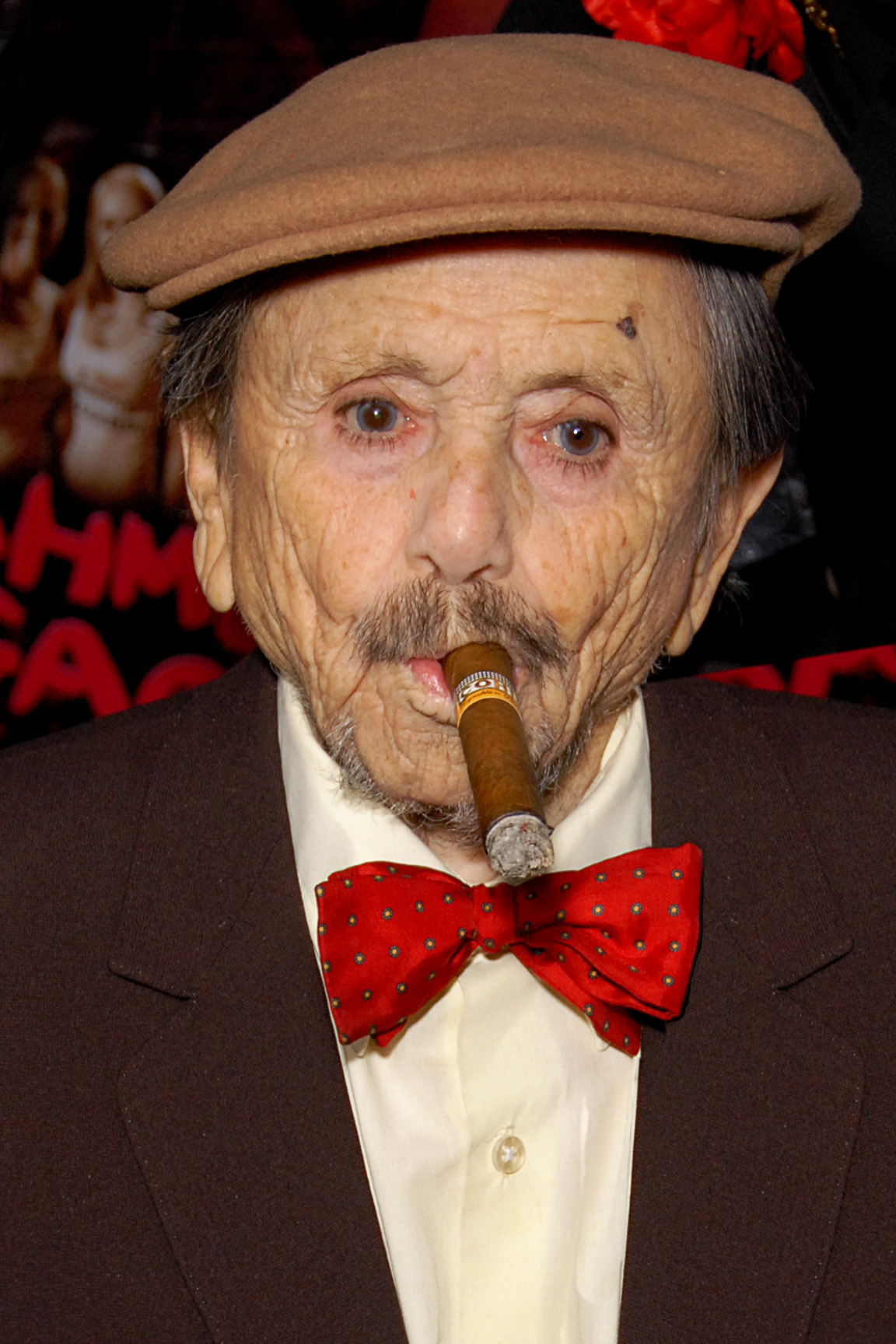
- Maren attending the premiere of Dahmer vs. Gacy in 2010
- Born: Gerard Marenghi; January 24, 1920; Lynn, Massachusetts, U.S.
- Died: May 24, 2018 (aged 98); La Jolla, California, U.S.
- Resting place: Forest Lawn Memorial Park, Hollywood Hills
- Occupation: Actor
- Years active: 1938–2016
- Known for: Last surviving adult Munchkin from 1939 film The Wizard of Oz
- Height: 4 ft 5 in (135 cm)
- Spouse: Elizabeth Barrington (m. 1975; died 2011)

Jerry Maren (born Gerard Marenghi; January 24, 1920 – May 24, 2018) was an American actor who played a Munchkin member of the Lollipop Guild in the 1939 Metro-Goldwyn-Mayer film The Wizard of Oz. He became the last surviving adult Munchkin (Note: A small number of female extras who portrayed Munchkins are known to survive, but they were children, rather than adults with dwarfism. Two stunt doubles, Ambrose Schindler (who died seven months after Maren) and Caren Marsh, also outlasted Maren at the time of his death.) following the death of Ruth Duccini in 2014, and was also the last surviving cast member with a specifically identifiable speaking or singing role.

== Early life ==
Gerard Marenghi, eventually known as Jerry Maren, was born in Lynn, Massachusetts, to Italian immigrant parents Emilio and Rafaella Marenghi. He was the youngest of eleven or twelve children. His father worked at a shoe factory. His four brothers were six feet (182.88 cm) or taller by 1939.

At the age of 12, Maren started taking dancing lessons with his sister. He toured around New England with his dance instructor with an act called Three Steps and a Hop and was noticed by Metro-Goldwyn-Mayer scouts who were looking for three little people who could sing and dance.

== Career ==
Maren received a telegram, just after graduating from high school, asking him to come to California to work on a film. He was offered nearly $100 per week plus expenses.

In The Wizard of Oz, he played the green-garbed member of the Lollipop Guild (between Jakob "Jackie" Gerlich and Harry Earles), handing a lollipop to Dorothy Gale (Judy Garland). Maren was 18 or 19 years old when he shot his scenes for The Wizard of Oz in the latter part of 1938 and early 1939. At that time he stood just around 3 ft 6 in (107 cm). (Hormone treatments allowed Maren to grow approximately a foot later in life.)

Maren began to cultivate his performance talents by creating a persona as a thirteen-year-old during school vacations. He began attending singing and dancing lessons in his early teens, and enjoyed them so much that he opted to team up with his teacher in an act known as "Three Steps and a Hop." The idea was a success on stage, and the group toured the New England circuit for a considerable length of time. In the same year as The Wizard of Oz, Maren appeared in an Our Gang short Tiny Troubles as the criminal "Light-Fingered Lester", and was an extra in the Western film The Terror of Tiny Town.

After The Wizard of Oz, Maren had roles in several movies and television shows, including a circus performer in the Marx Brothers film At The Circus (1939) and as an ape in Battle for the Planet of the Apes (1973). He is also featured, along with fellow Munchkin Billy Curtis, in American International Pictures' release Little Cigars (1973), about a gang of "midgets" on a crime spree.

Beginning in the 1950s, Maren worked for many years as Little Oscar for the Oscar Mayer Company and as Buster Brown in television and radio commercials. He later joined his friend Billy Barty in organizing Little People of America. He also portrayed Mayor McCheese and The Hamburglar in commercials for McDonald's. Maren was a stuntman on the 1975 film The Apple Dumpling Gang and said he "nearly got killed" filming a scene where a buckboard went out of control.

From 1969 until 1971, Maren appeared on The Andy Williams Show on a regular basis as the Little General. In the late 1970s, Maren was the dapper little man in top hat and tuxedo on The Gong Show, heralding each show's big finish with an onslaught of confetti as Milton DeLugg's band played "Hoop Dee Doo". He made a notable appearance in the episode "Felix the Horseplayer" of The Odd Couple as Harry Tallman, a racehorse exerciser who gives Oscar tips on winning horses. In 1982 he played Morris the bellboy, a regular character in the ABC sitcom No Soap, Radio.

Maren had a walk-on role in an episode of Seinfeld ("The Yada Yada") and played a mime in the 2010 comedy horror movie Dahmer vs. Gacy. He also starred in Eric Swelstad's horror movie Frankenstein Rising (2009). In February 2009, Maren performed in Project Lodestar Sagas as Thaddeus, opposite former MGM child actress Margaret O'Brien in the lead role of Livia Wells.

=== Promotional appearances ===
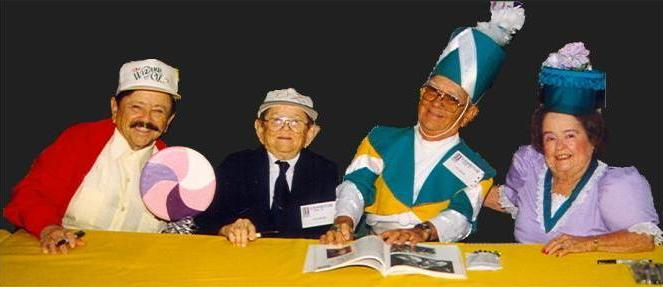
Maren (far left), Karl Slover, Clarence Swensen and Margaret Pellegrini in 1998

On November 21, 2007, Maren appeared with six other Munchkin actors at the unveiling of a Hollywood Star for the Wizard of Oz Munchkins on the Hollywood Walk of Fame. The other actors were Mickey Carroll, Ruth Duccini, Margaret Pellegrini, Meinhardt Raabe, Karl Slover, and Clarence Swensen.

On June 3, 2010, Maren appeared at Turning Stone Resort & Casino in Verona, New York, to promote a new Wizard of Oz slot machine.

After 2011, Maren stopped traveling or appearing at any of the Oz Festivals held throughout the country, but he did appear for a handprint and footprint ceremony at Grauman's Chinese Theatre in Hollywood on September 18, 2013.

== Personal life ==
Maren was married to Elizabeth Barrington from 1975 until her death at age 69 on January 27, 2011. He lived in southern California.

On February 29, 2016, it was reported that Maren had died of pancreatic cancer, but these reports were false. Maren posted a video on Instagram announcing that he was alive and did not have cancer.

When The Hollywood Reporter attempted to contact Maren for a story on little people in Hollywood in August 2016, Maren's caretakers informed the reporter that he was too frail to make further appearances or conduct interviews.

== Death ==
Maren died at a nursing facility center in La Jolla, California on May 24, 2018, at the age of 98, from a combination of old age-related diseases including cachexia, heart failure and senile dementia. He outlived all the major cast members as well as the original Tin Man Buddy Ebsen. Maren left no immediate survivors.

== Filmography ==
=== Film ===
Year	Title	Role	Notes
1938	The Terror of Tiny Town	Townsperson	Uncredited
1939	Tiny Troubles	Light Fingered Lester	Short
1939	The Wizard of Oz	Green Member of the Lollipop Guild	Uncredited
1939	At the Circus	Little Professor Atom	As Jerry Marenghi
1940	The Golden Fleecing	Midget in Phone Booth	Uncredited
1941	Maisie Was a Lady	Midget	Uncredited
1942	True to the Army	Col. Delaroy	Uncredited
1942	Fingers at the Window	Small Boy	Uncredited
1942	Beyond the Blue Horizon	Native	Uncredited
1942	Here We Go Again	Body Double for Charlie McCarthy in Motion	Also stand-in for Charlie McCarthy
1943	Flesh and Fantasy	Midget	Uncredited
1944	Silent Partner	Messenger	Uncredited
1944	Johnny Doesn't Live Here Anymore	Gremlin	
1945	Bring on the Girls	Midget in Fireman Skit	Uncredited
1945	The Great John L.	Midget	
1945	That's the Spirit	Midget	Uncredited
1945	Duffy's Tavern	Midget	Uncredited
1945	An Angel Comes to Brooklyn	Midget Baby	Uncredited
1946	Three Wise Fools	Sir Boulder	Uncredited
1948	Are You with It?	Midget	Uncredited
1948	When My Baby Smiles at Me	Midget	Uncredited
1949	Samson and Delilah	Jester	Uncredited
1951	Superman and the Mole Men	Mole-Man	Uncredited
1968	Planet of the Apes	Child Ape	Uncredited
1969	Hello, Dolly!	Midget	Uncredited
1970	Bigfoot	Baby Creature	
1971	Outlaw Riders	Bartender	
1971	Dirty Harry	Stunts	Uncredited
1973	Little Cigars	Cadillac	
1978	The Return of Captain Nemo	Caesar	TV movie
1978	The Bad News Bears Go to Japan	Page Boy	
1978	The Lord of the Rings	Character Actor	Voice
1979	Americathon	Act	
1979	Prophecy	Stunts	
1979	The Making of The Wizard of Oz	Himself	
1980	Where the Buffalo Roam	Bell Man	
1981	Side Show	Tom Tiny	TV movie
1981	Under the Rainbow	Hotel Rainbow Guest	
1982	Tron		Uncredited
1983	Something Wicked This Way Comes	Demon Midget	Uncredited
1983	High School U.S.A.	Robot	TV movie
1983	The Being	Monster	As Jerry Marin
1984	Hot Moves	Arcade Vendor	
1984	It Came Upon the Midnight Clear	Elf #3	TV movie
1985	Petronella	George	TV movie
1985	House	Little Critter	
1985	Graffiti	Citizen	Short
1987	Spaceballs		Uncredited
1988	The Great Outdoors	The Old Man Stranger	Uncredited
1990	The Dreamer of Oz	Mr. Munchkin	TV movie
1990	The Wonderful Wizard of Oz: 50 Years of Magic	Himself	
1993	We're Off to See the Munchkins		
1994	The Bible According to Hollywood	Himself	
1994	In Search of Oz	Himself	
1994	I Married a Munchkin	Himself	
1998	Glorious Technicolor	Himself	
1999	A Tribute to The Wizard of Oz	Himself	
2000	Bit Players	Oompa Loompa	Short
2001	Memories of Oz	Himself	
2004	Todd Browning's 'Freaks': The Sideshow Cinema	Himself	Also "Special Thanks" credit
2005	Best Ever Family Films	Himself	
2005	The 100 Greatest Family Films	Himself	
2009	The Yellow Brick Road and Beyond	Actor / Munchkin	Also "Special Thanks" credit, credited as Jerry Marin
2009	Hollywood Celebrates Its Biggest Little Stars!	Himself	
2009	The 78th Annual Hollywood Christmas Parade	Himself	
2009	To Oz! The Making of a Classic	Himself	(Archive footage)
2010	Frankenstein Rising	Manlon	
2010	Dahmer vs. Gacy	Mime	
2010	Heroic Ambition	Himself	
2011	Best in Film: The Greatest Movies of Our Time	Himself	
2016	The Hollywood Shorties	Himself	(Archive footage)

=== Television ===
Title	Year	Role	Notes
1953	Adventures of Superman	Mole-Man #3	2 episodes, archive footage
1954	Smilin' Ed's Gang		1 episode
1955	Andy's Gang	Buster Brown	Voice
1956	Producers' Showcase		1 episode
1960	This Is Your Life	Himself	1 episode
1965	Bob Hope Christmas Show	Sketch Performer	Uncredited
1966	The Beverly Hillbillies	Spaceman #2	1 episode
1967	Bewitched	Gremlin	1 episode
1967	The Wild Wild West	Coco	1 episode
1968	The Bob Hope Special	Santa's Elf	1 episode
1969-1971	The Andy Williams Show	The Little General	
1970	Julia	Little Green Man	1 episode
1970	Get Smart	Lower Gemini	1 episode
1971	Here's Lucy	Milton	1 episode
1971	Rowan & Martin's Laugh-In	Himself	1 episode
1971-1972	Lidsville	Boris/Rah-Rah	17 episodes
1975	The Odd Couple	Harry Tallman	1 episode
1975	When Things Were Rotten	Archer	1 episode
1976	The Gong Show	Confetti Thrower	
1976	Van Dyke and Company	Midget Basketball Player	1 episode
1977	Switch	Shoe Shiner	1 episode
1977	Mary Hartman, Mary Hartman	Dash	5 episodes
1977	Charlie's Angels	Circus Worker	1 episode
1978	Hollywood Greats	Himself	1 episode
1982	Lou Grant	Man on Street	1 episode
1982	No Soap, Radio	Morris	5 episodes
1983	Wizards and Warriors	Floyd the Feather	1 episode
1986	The Twilight Zone	Creature	1 episode, segment: "Personal Demons"
1989	Short Ribbs		1 episode
1992	MGM: When the Lion Roars	Himself	1 episode
1997	Seinfeld	Dad	1 episode
1997	Biography	Himself	1 episode
1998	E! Mysteries & Scandals	Himself	1 episode
1999-2000	The Daily Show	Himself	2 episodes
2007	TV Land: Myths and Legends	Himself	1 episode
