= Under the Rainbow =

1981 comedy movie

- Theatrical release poster
- Directed by: Steve Rash
- Screenplay by: Pat McCormick; Harry Hurwitz; Martin Smith; Fred Bauer; Pat Bradley
- Story by: Fred Bauer; Pat Bradley
- Produced by: Fred Bauer
- Starring: Chevy Chase; Carrie Fisher; Eve Arden; Adam Arkin; Billy Barty; Robert Donner; Joseph Maher; Cork Hubbert; Mako; Pat McCormick
- Cinematography: Frank Stanley
- Edited by: David Blewitt
- Music by: Joe Renzetti
- Production company: Orion Pictures
- Distributed by: Warner Bros.
- Release date: July 31, 1981
- Running time: 97 minutes
- Country: United States
- Language: English
- Budget: $18 million
- Box office: $18.8 million

Under the Rainbow is a 1981 American comedy film directed by Steve Rash and starring Chevy Chase, Carrie Fisher, Eve Arden, and Billy Barty. Set in 1938, the film's plot is loosely based on the gathering of little people in a Hollywood hotel to audition for roles as Munchkins in Metro-Goldwyn-Mayer's 1939 film The Wizard of Oz. Jerry Maren, who had a role as a Munchkin in the original film, also appears in Under the Rainbow. Filming locations include the original Culver Hotel, which was used by Munchkin actors during the filming of The Wizard of Oz.

The film received widespread negative reception with critics due to its depiction of little people and use of sight gags involving them. Earning just $18.8 million during its initial run, the film is considered a failure at box office. It was nominated for two Golden Raspberry Awards for Joe Renzetti and Billy Barty.

== Plot ==
The year is 1938, on the eve of World War II. In Kansas, little person Rollo Sweet lives in a homeless shelter while dreaming of a future in Hollywood. Other residents crowd around a radio to listen to an address by President Franklin D. Roosevelt, but the reception is poor. Rollo climbs to the roof to fix the antenna, then slips and falls from the roof.

In Culver City, California, near Metro-Goldwyn-Mayer Studios, a diverse group of people check into a hotel. Among the hotel guests are Annie Clark, a long-suffering employee at MGM, and her assistant Homer; an Austrian duke, duchess, and their Secret Service escort Bruce Thorpe; Nazi secret agent Otto Kriegling; Kriegling's Japanese contact Nakomuri; a large group of Japanese photographers; and 150 little people, including Sweet, who have been cast as Munchkins in MGM's The Wizard of Oz. The hotel itself has been left in the hands of the owner Lester Stahl's incompetent nephew Henry while the boss is out of town on business.

The characters' lives intertwine through various cases of mistaken identity. Kriegling incorrectly assumes his contact from Tokyo must be one of the photographers. Nakomuri, knowing only that his Nazi contact is a little person, believes he must be hidden among the Munchkins. Nazi military maps are smuggled into Annie's copy of the screenplay for The Wizard of Oz. An assassin on the trail of the Duke and Duchess kills Akido, one of the Japanese tourists, instead. Homer assumes Kriegling to be one of the Munchkins and carries him off to the studio costume and makeup shop. Meanwhile, the Munchkins' constant drunken antics make life difficult for everyone.

Finally, Kriegling and Nakomuri corner Annie, Thorpe, the Duke and the Duchess in a hotel room, where the assassin makes one last attempt on the Duke's life. As he draws his gun, Nakomuri points his camera at the assassin. A bullet fires from the "camera" and the two shoot each other dead.

Kriegling points his sword at Annie's throat demanding to have the map. Thorpe tells him the map is hidden in a locket on the Duchess's dog's collar. Kriegling runs out of the hotel front door after the dog, which runs onto the movie studio lot where it, Kriegling, and the pursuing crowd of Munchkin actors disrupt the filming of Gone with the Wind. Kriegling gets the locket and tries to get away in a vintage bus, with Sweet pursuing him in a horse-drawn carriage. The chase ends as the two crash.

Sweet wakes up back in Kansas. As in The Wizard of Oz, the whole story was a dream, populated by characters based on the other homeless people in the shelter. A bus full of little people arrives and Sweet realizes he is on his way to Hollywood.

== Cast ==
- Chevy Chase as Bruce Thorpe
- Carrie Fisher as Annie Clark
- Eve Arden as The Duchess
- Adam Arkin as Henry Hudson
- Billy Barty as Otto Kriegling
- Robert Donner as The Assassin
- Cork Hubbert as Rollo Sweet
- Joseph Maher as The Duke
- Mako as Nakomuri
- Pat McCormick as Tiny
- Peter Issacksen as Homer
- Jack Kruschen as Louie
- Richard Stahl as Lester Hudson
- Freeman King as Otis
- Bennett Ohta as Akido
- Louisa Moritz as Operator
- Patty Maloney as Rosie
- Zelda Rubinstein as Iris
- Ruth Brown as Cleaning Woman
- Twink Caplan as Cigarette Girl
- Tony Cox as Hotel Guest
- Phil Fondacaro as Hotel Guest
- Jerry Maren as Smokey
- Debbie Lee Carrington as Hotel Guest
- Marcia de Rousse as Hotel Guest
- Michael Gilden as Hotel Guest
- Matt Roloff as Hotel Guest
- Felix Silla as Hotel Guest

== Production ==
Fred Bauer, Steve Rash and Ed Cohen had previously made The Buddy Holly Story together. In November 1979 the filmmakers announced they had signed a deal with the newly formed Orion Pictures to make the movie with Chevy Chase to star. Production was delayed due to an impending actors strike. "The heart of the film is that no person's dream is too big or too small," said Bauer. "This is America where you can do whatever you want." Cohen said "we've taken something that really happened and turned it into entertainment."

The production marked the first film role of several actors, including Phil Fondacaro and Debbie Lee Carrington. Jerry Maren, who played the small role of Smokey in this film, had previously played a member of the Lollipop Guild in The Wizard of Oz.

Some location filming occurred at the Culver Hotel, where the actors playing Munchkins had actually stayed during the production of The Wizard of Oz. Filming took over four months. Various reasons were given including the lack of acting experience among the little people, and Chase's depression following the death of Douglas Kenney (something Chase denied).

== Reception ==
The film was a box office disappointment grossing $8.3 million in its initial run. According to Rotten Tomatoes, 0% of professional critics gave the film a favorable review. The film was nominated for Razzie Awards for Worst Musical Score (Joe Renzetti) and Worst Supporting Actor (Billy Barty). It received extremely negative reviews, many of which condemned the various sight gags involving the little people.
