= Prince Denis =

- Born: January 26, 1900; Bidache, France
- Died: June 20, 1984 (aged 84); Phoenix, Arizona, U.S.
- Other name: Prince Dennison
- Occupation: Actor
- Spouse(s): Ethel W. Denis (m.1939-1968)

Prince Denis (January 26, 1900 – June 20, 1984) was a French-born American actor of sideshows and film with dwarfism, best known for his role as the Sergeant-at-Arms of Munchkinland in the 1939 film The Wizard of Oz.

== Early life ==
Originally from France, Denis moved to the United States and changed his name to Dennison before eventually legally changing it to Prince Denis.

== Career ==
Denis toured various circuses, including the Ringling Brothers and Barnum & Bailey, with his two sisters, Princess Marguerite and Lady Little. Denis would later go on to appear in the 1939 film The Wizard of Oz at the age of 25. His wife Ethel also had a minor role as a Munchkin in the film. He stated that he had played the role of the mayor of Munchkinland and that Charlie Becker, who had played the mayor, was selected to play the sergeant-in-arms. It was later learned that Denis had lied for more publicity.

Denis later went on to appear in films such as The Greatest Show on Earth and Three Wise Fools.

== Death ==
Denis died at the Maricopa Medical Center in Phoenix, Arizona, on June 20, 1984, at the age of 84.
