= Midget Football League of Manitoba =

Football league located in Manitoba, Canada

The Midget Football League of Manitoba (MFLM) is a league for Canadian football located in the Canadian province of Manitoba for players of ages 15–17 years old. The league currently has eight teams: the Sunrise Coyotes, Southwest Wolves, Greendell Falcons, Interlake Thunder, St. Vital Mustangs, and Transcona Nationals. Most teams are located in Winnipeg; however, Eastman, Interlake, and Pembina Valley are based in Steinbach, Stonewall, and Winkler respectively.

== Provincial Champions ==
2016 - Falcons Football Club
2015 - St. Vital Mustangs
2014 - Transcona Nationals
2013 - St. Vital Mustangs
2012 - North Winnipeg Nomads
2011 - St. Vital Mustangs
2010 - North Winnipeg Nomads
2009 - Eastman Raiders
2008 - St. Vital Mustangs
2007 - St. Vital Mustangs
2006 - North Winnipeg Nomads
2005 - St. Vital Mustangs
2004 - Transcona Nationals
2003 - Fort Garry Lions
2002 - North Winnipeg Nomads
2001 - Fort Garry Lions
2000 - Fort Garry Lions
1999 - St. James Rods
1998 - St. James Rods
1997 - St. James Rods
1996 - St. Vital Mustangs
1995 - St. Vital Mustangs
1994 - North Winnipeg Nomads
1993 - Transcona Nationals
1992 - St. Vital Mustangs
1991 - Transcona Nationals
1990 - North Winnipeg Nomads
1989 - St. Vital Mustangs
1988 - St. James Rods
1987 - St. James Rods
1986 - St. James Rods
1985 - St. James Rods
1984 - St. Vital Mustangs
1983 - St. James Rods
1982 - St. Vital Mustangs
1981 - North Winnipeg Nomads
1980 - Fort Rouge Packers
1979 - Fort Garry Lions
1978 - Fort Garry Lions
1977 - Fort Rouge Packers
1976 - St. Boniface Warriors
1975 - St. Boniface Warriors
1974 - St.James Cobras
1973 - North Winnipeg Nomads
1972 - North Winnipeg Nomads
1971 - River Heights Cardinals
1970 - North Winnipeg Nomads
1969 - River Heights Cardinals
1968 - North Kildonan Lions
1967 - Clifton Cougars
1966 - North Kildonan Lions
1965 - North Kildonan Lions
1964 - North Kildonan Lions
1963 - St. James Spartans
1962 - Fort Garry Lions
1961 - Fort Garry Lions
1960 - Transcona Nationals
1959 - St. James Spartans
1958 -
1957 - St. Vital Tigers

== Outstanding Player Awards ==
=== Most Valuable Player – Offence ===
2012 - Jonathan Remple, Pembina Valley Cornhuskers
2011 - Matt Nikkel, St. Vital Mustangs
2010 - Justin Klaprat, North Winnipeg Nomads
2009 - Kelly Sansregret, Eastman Raiders
2008 - Theo Stevens, North Winnipeg Nomads
2007 - Scott Janz, Fort Garry Lions
2006 - Braeden Martens, Eastman Raiders
2005 - Joe Holder, Fort Garry Lions
2004 - Joe Holder, Fort Garry Lions
2003 - James Gerardy, Fort Garry Lions
2002 - James Gerardy, Fort Garry Lions
2001 - Paul Teitz, Fort Garry Lions
2000 - Nathan Friesen, St. Vital Mustangs
1999 - Eric Rout, Fort Garry Lions
1998 - Cory Holly, Transcona Nationals
1997 - Jason Huclack, St. James Rods
1996 - Justin Holmond, East Side Eagles
1995 - Bart Dyszy, East Side Eagles
1994 - Jimmy Lee, St. Vital Mustangs
1993 - Jamie Swaile, St. Vital Mustangs
1992 - Jody Berthelette, Fort Garry Lions
1991 - Jason Thompson, Transcona Nationals
1990 - Kerry Walker, East Side Eagles
1989 - Brett Taplin, East Side Eagles
1988 - Tony Kranjc, St. James Rods
1987 - Shawn Arnal, Fort Garry Lions

=== Most Valuable Player – Defence ===
2012 - Brock Letkeman, Eastman Raiders
2011 - Taylor Fast, Eastman Raiders
2010 - Donovan Gregoire, St. Vital Mustangs
2009 - Devon Anderson, St. Vital Mustangs (tie)
2009 - Matthew Soldier, North Winnipeg Nomads (tie)
2008 - Luke Jacobucci, Fort Garry Lions
2007 - Matthew Anderson, St. Vital Mustangs
2006 - Justin Desmarais, North Winnipeg Nomads
2005 - Sean Wegner, Transcona Nationals
2004 - Adam Giesbrecht, Eastman Raiders
2003 - Mark Giesbrecht, Eastman Raiders
2002 - Lars Nicholson, North Winnipeg Nomads
2001 - Paul Shea, St. James Rods
2000 - Kenton Onofrychuk, Fort Garry Lions
1999 - Cory Huclack, St. James Rods
1998 - Stefan Hirsch, East Side Eagles
1997 - John Prydun, Transcona Nationals
1996 - Stefan Hirsch, East Side Eagles
1995 - Matthew Leitch, East Side Eagles
1994 - John Froese, East Side Eagles
1993 - Mike Girardin, St. Vital Mustangs

=== Special Teams Player of the Year ===
2012 - Kai Madsen, St. Vital Mustangs
2011 - Cam Penner, St. Vital Mustangs
2010 - Cam Penner, St. Vital Mustangs
2009 - Brett Carter, St. Vital Mustangs
2008 - Ryan Jones, Transcona Nationals
2007 - Mark Pullen, Fort Garry Lions
2006 - Andrew Sheldon, St. James Rods
2005 - Jon Delipper, St. James Rods

=== Matt Sheridan Lineman of the Year ===
2012 - Chris Simundson, North Winnipeg Nomads
2011 - Geoff Gray, Greendell Falcons
2010 - Samuel Grant, North Winnipeg Nomads
2009 - Nick Genung, Transcona Nationals
2008 - Luke Boschman, St. Vital Mustangs
2007 - Tyler Fabbri, St. Vital Mustangs
2006 - Jordan Balzar, Transcona Nationals
2005 - Robbie Brar, St. Vital Mustangs

=== Rookie of the Year ===
2012 - Brandon Sitch, St. Vital Mustangs
2011 - Austin Catellier, Eastman Raiders
2010 - Dylan Floyde, Fort Garry Lions
2009 - Donovan Grégoire, Transcona Nationals
2008 - DJ Reimer, Eastman Raiders
2007 - Kelly Sansregret, Eastman Raiders (tie)
2007 - Jordan Doiron, St. Vital Mustangs (tie)
2007 - T.J. Alty, Fort Garry Lions (tie)
2006 - Evan Husack, St. James Rods
2005 - Scott Janz, Fort Garry Lions

=== President's Award ===
(Awarded as Most Valuable Player (League) prior to 2008)

2012 - Jonathan Remple, Pembina Valley Cornhuskers
2011 - Erik Deboer-Borud, North Winnipeg Nomads
2010 - Tyson Haines, North Winnipeg Nomads
2009 - Joss Gowland, Eastman Raiders
2008 - Ryan Messner, North Winnipeg Nomads
2007 - Scott Janz, Fort Garry Lions
2006 - Kyle Willis, North Winnipeg Nomads
