= Marc Wasserman =

American actor and lawyer

- Born: July 25, 1968 (age 57); Cerritos, California, U.S.
- Occupation: lawyer
- Known for: Pot Brothers at Law

Marc David Wasserman (born July 25, 1968) is an actor and lawyer best known for being one of the Pot Brothers at Law along with his brother Craig. The Pot Brothers become known as lawyers who assist people in getting their marijuana businesses up and running, as well as helping people fight cannabis convictions and other criminal defense work.

== The Pot Brothers ==
Wasserman was admitted to the California State bar in June, 1996. This was just before Proposition 215 was enacted. One of his first clients was a criminal cannabis charge. Craig's son J Cures (Jerett Wasserman) is a cannabis grower and Craig helped him set up his California business initially. When J Cures got arrested, he did not say anything to the police who lied and said that they had verbal consent. The case was dismissed. This led to The Pot Brothers' series of videos telling people how to act when cops pull them over.

The first video, posted with the hashtag stfu, explained a script for people to use to remember not to talk to the police and preserve their rights. It went viral, being reposted by Roger Stone, P. Diddy, and Snoop Dogg. The script for talking to law enforcement, which can be distilled to 25 words, is promoted by the brothers on social media. Wasserman is the face of the group on TikTok and does the social media for The Pot Brothers. He has also helped other cannabis-focused Instagrammers appeal their bans on the platform. The brothers have a Cannabis Talk 101 podcast on I Heart Radio. The firm won Advocates of the Year at the International Cannabis Business Awards in 2019.

== Acting ==
Wasserman began acting as a child appearing in one episode of Sigmund and the Sea Monsters and a few episodes of CHiPs. He has discussed being sexually harassed by a casting director. He later formed his own production company and wrote and produced the movie Commute with Ford Austin & Dave Cohen which won Best Feature Comedy at the Bare Bones Film Festival in 2008. Frequently collaborates with actor-director Ford Austin

== Personal life ==
Wasserman was born in Cerritos. He is married to Janet Wasserman. The couple have three children. Hollywood filmmaker Ford Austin is godfather to his daughter Jules Wasserman.
