= Clarence Swensen =

American actor (1917–2009)

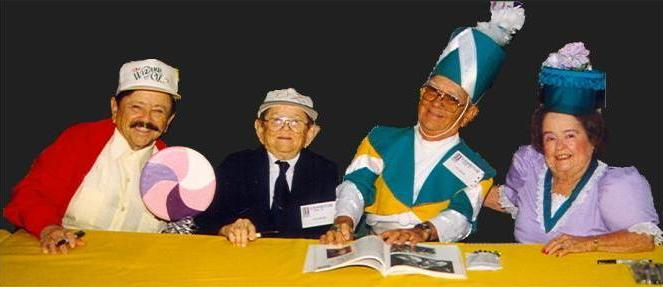
- Swenson (third from left) with Jerry Maren, Karl Slover and Margaret Pellegrini (1998)
- Born: December 29, 1917; Austin, Texas, U.S.
- Died: February 25, 2009 (aged 91); Pflugerville, Texas, U.S.
- Resting place: Cook Walden Capital Parks Cemetery, Austin
- Occupation: Actor
- Years active: 1938–2005; 2007
- Spouse: Myrna Swensen

August Clarence Swensen (December 29, 1917 – February 25, 2009) was an American actor and was one of the Munchkins in the 1939 film The Wizard of Oz.

== Early life ==
Swensen was born on December 29, 1917, and grew up in Austin, Texas. He was not allowed to attend a public school until he was nine because of his size.

== Career ==
At 4ft 6in, he played one of the 25 Munchkin soldiers in the 1939 film The Wizard of Oz.

He also appeared in The Terror of Tiny Town as a preacher. Many of his Oz co-stars were cast members of this Western musical film. He wore a chimp suit for Tarzan Finds a Son! with Johnny Weissmuller.

His wife Myrna was also up for a part in The Wizard of Oz, but illness forced her to miss the opportunity.

== Later life and death ==
After experiencing a stroke in 2005, he was unable to walk and ended up in a wheelchair as a result. He experienced poor health then after but still attended many events with the other surviving Munchkins, including the presentation of the Munchkins' star on the Hollywood Walk of Fame in 2007.

Swensen died on February 25, 2009, at the age of 91. He outlived every major cast member of The Wizard of Oz.

== Filmography ==
| Year | Title | Role | Notes |
|---|---|---|---|
| 1938 | The Terror of Tiny Town | Preacher | Uncredited |
| 1939 | The Wizard of Oz | Munchkin Soldier | Uncredited |
