= Meinhardt Raabe =

American actor (1915–2010)

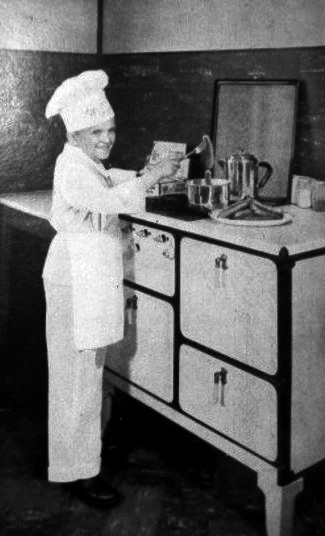
- Raabe as "Little Oscar", circa 1930s/1940s
- Born: Meinhardt Frank Raabe; September 2, 1915; Watertown, Wisconsin, US
- Died: April 9, 2010 (aged 94); Penney Farms, Florida, US
- Occupation: Actor
- Years active: 1935–2010
- Spouse: Marie Hartline (m. 1946; died 1997)

Meinhardt Frank Raabe (/ˈmaɪnˌhɑːrt ˈrɑːbi/; September 2, 1915 – April 9, 2010) was an American actor. In The Wizard of Oz, he portrayed the coroner who certified the death of the Wicked Witch of the East. He was one of the last surviving Munchkin actors in the film, and was also the last surviving cast member with any dialogue.

== Early life ==
Raabe was born in Watertown, Wisconsin, as a son of Henry H. Raabe and Eleonora Mina (née Rummler) Raabe. He attended and graduated from Johnson Creek High School in Johnson Creek, Wisconsin before graduating from the University of Wisconsin in 1937, with a bachelor's degree in accounting. He later received an MBA at Drexel University.

Raabe did not hear the words "midget" or "dwarf" until young adulthood, and for a long time believed no one else might also be like him. After visiting the Midget Village at Chicago's Century of Progress in 1933, he realized he was not alone and took a summer job with the fair the next year. After graduating from the University of Wisconsin, he was turned down for employment by one company after another until Oscar Mayer hired him as a salesman. Raabe took a leave of absence from his sales job to audition for the Wizard of Oz role.

== Roles ==
At about 107 centimetres (42 in), or three feet, six inches, tall, he played the role of the coroner in The Wizard of Oz in 1939. Raabe, however, was uncredited in the role. In the film, the coroner confirms the death of the Wicked Witch of the East, with Raabe's lines being:

As coroner, I must aver
I thoroughly examined her
And she's not only merely dead
She's really, most sincerely dead!

These lines, like most of those delivered by the Munchkins, were dubbed over with the speeded-up voices of other performers. In addition to his role in the film, Raabe worked for many decades as a spokesman for Oscar Mayer, where he was known as "Little Oscar, World's Smallest Chef". He traveled in the 1952 version of the Oscar Mayer Wienermobile, which was the idea of the company founder's nephew, Carl Mayer, in 1936. Because the vehicle had little space for any passengers, Mayer realized the spokesman would have to be small, and Raabe got the job.

== Later career ==
Raabe continued to work for Oscar Mayer, and claimed to have come up with the idea to sell canned sausages. As the idea was being commercialized, the Army realized that this product would aid in feeding American soldiers in the field, and production was diverted to military consumption, as the United States entered World War II. During the war Raabe joined the Civil Air Patrol, serving as a pilot, and flying fire and lake patrol missions as well as serving as a ground instructor. In 1970, he earned a master's degree in business administration from Drexel University. He married a cigarette girl who was his height, Margaret Marie Raabe (1915–1997). They were married for 50 years until her death in a car accident in 1997, in which he was also injured.

Raabe published an autobiography, Memories of a Munchkin: An Illustrated Walk Down the Yellow Brick Road. (ISBN 0-8230-9193-7). As of 2007, he lived alone at the Penney Retirement Community in Penney Farms, Florida.

Raabe appeared in an October 2005 episode of Entertainment Tonight with eight other surviving Munchkins, and he made a guest appearance on Jimmy Kimmel Live! on April 11, 2005. On November 21, 2007, he appeared with six other surviving Munchkin actors, including Jerry Maren, at the unveiling of a Hollywood Star for the Wizard of Oz Munchkins on the Hollywood Walk of Fame. On September 19, 2009, he appeared on National Public Radio program Weekend Edition Saturday.

Raabe still made occasional appearances at Wizard of Oz conventions and celebrations across the country. In 2008 he was honored by the International Wizard of Oz Club with the organization's L. Frank Baum Memorial Award.

== Death ==
In later life, Raabe resided at Penney Retirement Community in Penney Farms, Florida. He died at a medical center in nearby Orange Park, Florida, on April 9, 2010, at the age of 94, after going into cardiac arrest. He is buried in Farmington, Wisconsin's Immanuel Evangelical Lutheran Church Cemetery.
