= Margaret Pellegrini =

American actress, vaudeville performer and dancer (1923–2013)

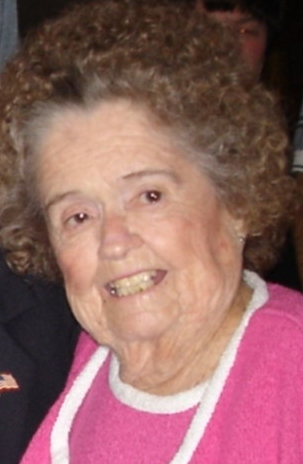
- Pellegrini in 2006
- Born: Margaret Williams; September 23, 1923; Tuscumbia, Alabama, U.S.
- Died: August 7, 2013 (aged 89); Glendale, Arizona, U.S.
- Occupations: Actress; vaudeville performer; dancer
- Years active: 1938–2013
- Spouse: Willie Pellegrini
- Children: 2

Margaret Pellegrini (née Williams; September 23, 1923 – August 7, 2013) was an American actress, vaudeville performer and dancer, best known for playing one of the Munchkins from the 1939 film The Wizard of Oz. Until her death in 2013, she was one of the three surviving munchkins, the other two being Jerry Maren and Ruth Robinson Duccini.

== Life and career ==
Pellegrini was born Margaret Williams in Tuscumbia, Alabama on September 23, 1923. When she was helping a relative in a potato chip booth at the Tennessee State Fair, a group of little people came by and asked if she wanted to join their show, Henry Kramer's Midgets. "At that time I didn't think I was a midget," says Pellegrini (who then stood about 3 ft 4 in (1.02 m)). In the film, Pellegrini played a "sleepyhead" flower pot and Munchkin villager. After the film, she married Willie Pellegrini (an average-sized ex-fighter) and had two children. Through the years, Pellegrini frequently appeared at surviving Munchkins of Oz festivities.

=== Hollywood Walk of Fame ===
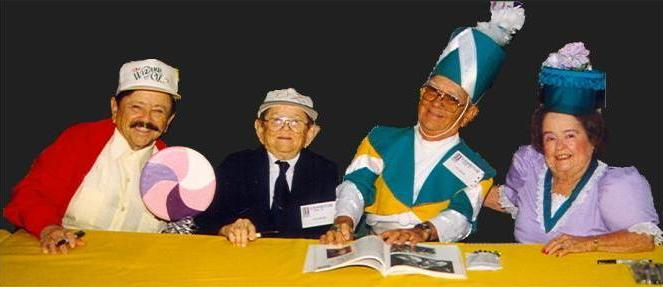
From left: Jerry Maren (Lollipop Guild), Karl Slover, Clarence Swensen, and Pellegrini (1998)

Pellegrini was present on November 21, 2007, when the remaining Munchkins were given a star on the Hollywood Walk of Fame. She was also named the Grand Marshal of that year's annual "Oz-Stravaganza" parade in Chittenango, New York, but health issues prevented her from attending. Near the time of her death, she was described as a widowed great-great-grandmother living in Glendale, Arizona, with a room in her house devoted to her treasured Oz collectibles.

=== Death ===
Pellegrini died in Glendale, Arizona on August 7, 2013, due to complications from a stroke she had two days earlier. She outlived every major cast member of The Wizard of Oz. She was 89. Her burial is at Holy Cross Cemetery in Avondale, Arizona.

== Filmography ==
Year	Title	Role	Notes
1939	The Wizard of Oz	Munchkin Villager/Sleepyhead	Uncredited
1971	Johnny Got His Gun		Uncredited
1990	The Wonderful Wizard of Oz: 50 Years of Magic		Acknowledgement credit
1993	We're Off to See the Munchkins		
1994	I Married a Munchkin	Sleepyhead	
1997	Biography	Herself	1 episode
2001	Memories of Oz	Herself	
2005	Entertainment Tonight	Herself	1 episode
2005	Because of the Wonderful Things It Does: The Legacy of Oz	Herself	
2009	The Yellow Brick Road and Beyond	Herself/Munchkin	Also special thanks credit
2009	Hollywood Celebrates Its Biggest Little Stars!	Herself	
2013	The Making of the Wonderful Wizard of Oz		
