= Ruth Duccini =

American actress (1918–2014)

- Duccini on the set of The Wizard of Oz, c. 1939
- Born: Ruth Leone Robinson; July 23, 1918; Rush City, Minnesota, U.S.
- Died: January 16, 2014 (aged 95); Las Vegas, Nevada, U.S.
- Occupation: Actress
- Years active: 1936–2013
- Known for: Last surviving female adult Munchkin from 1939 film The Wizard of Oz; penultimate surviving adult Munchkin
- Spouse: Fred Duccini (m. 1943; died 1994)

Ruth Leone Duccini (née Robinson; July 23, 1918 – January 16, 2014) was an American actress.

== Life and career ==
Duccini was born on July 23, 1918. She is best known as the penultimate surviving Munchkin from the 1939 film The Wizard of Oz. Her role in the film as a Munchkin villager was not credited. Her most recent appearances were when she and the other surviving Munchkins were presented with a star on the Hollywood Walk of Fame on November 21, 2007, and attending the premiere of the film's 75th anniversary at the Grauman's Chinese Theatre. She also was seen in Under the Rainbow (1981) and Memories of Oz (2001).

While Duccini could not recall in 2013 what she earned filming Oz, the Munchkin village actors were paid $50 a week during filming, plus room/board. She said of her World War II work:

"The one thing that I'm most proud of, during the Second World War, I worked on airplanes in a defense plant. I was a Rosie the Riveter. I'm really proud of that."

Duccini made the news again when Margaret Thatcher died, and critics of the former British premier tried to propel "Ding-Dong! The Witch Is Dead" onto the chart to celebrate her death. Duccini and Jerry Maren (who would become the last surviving adult Munchkin) said the song was never to be used in such a way, stating:

"Nobody deserves to be treated in such a way. When we were filming the movie no one intended it to be used in that way. I am ashamed, I really am."

Duccini died in Las Vegas on January 16, 2014, at the age of 95. She outlived every major cast member of The Wizard of Oz.

== Filmography ==
Year	Title	Role	Notes
1939	The Wizard of Oz	Munchkin Villager	Uncredited
1981	Under the Rainbow	Hotel Rainbow Guest	
1999	The Daily Show	Herself	1 episode
2001	Memories of Oz	Herself	
2013	The Making of the Wonderful Wizard of Oz		
