= Munchkin =

Fictional ethnic group from the Oz series by L. Frank Baum

The Munchkins
- Oz books character
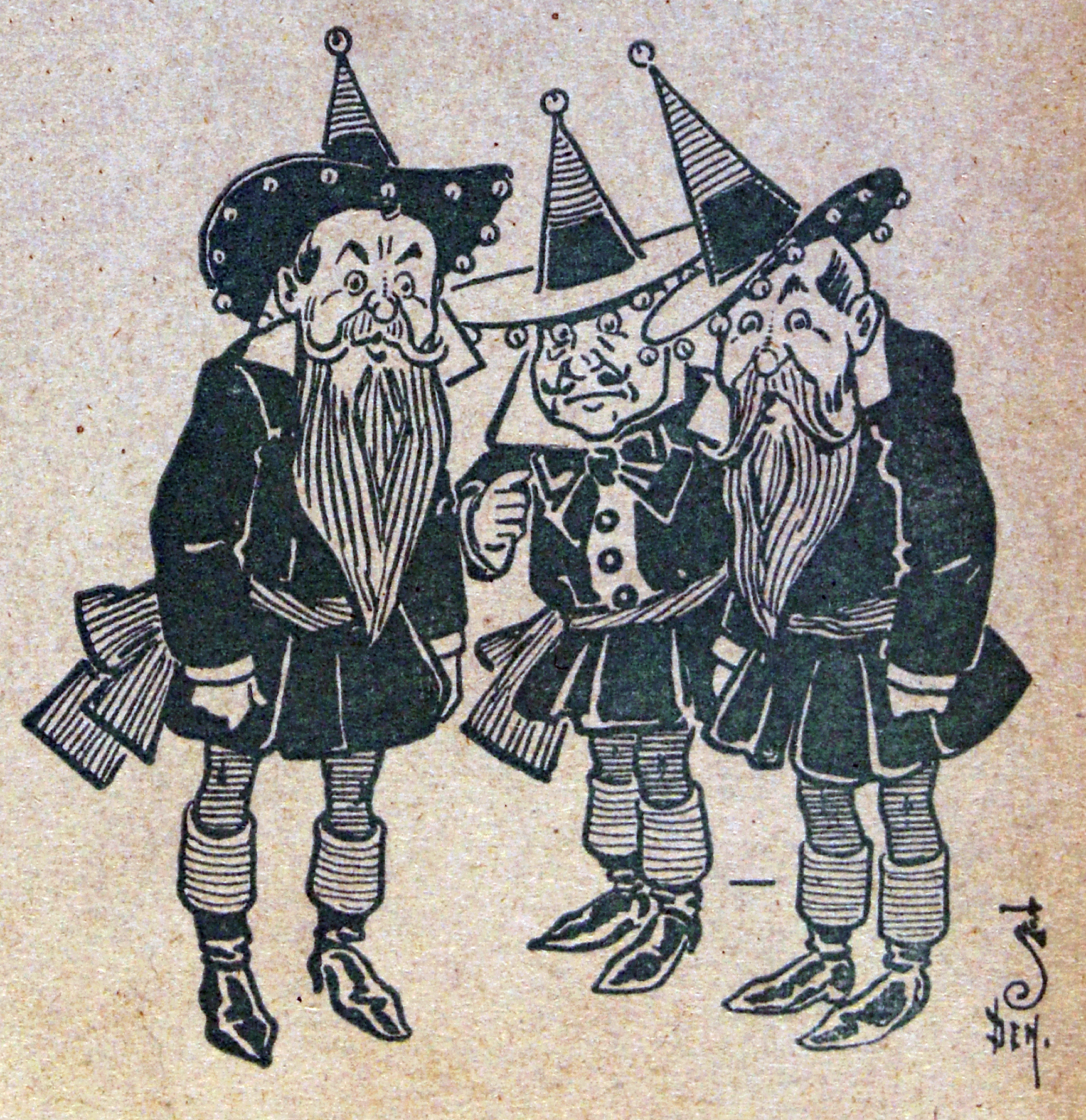
- W. W. Denslow's depiction of Munchkins, from first edition of The Wonderful Wizard of Oz
- First appearance: The Wonderful Wizard of Oz (1900)
- Created by: L. Frank Baum
- Species: Humanoid, similar to dwarves or gnomes
- Origin: Munchkin Country

A Munchkin is a native of the fictional Munchkin Country in the Oz books by American author L. Frank Baum. Although a common fixture in Germanic fairy tales, they are introduced to modern audiences with the first appearance in the classic children's novel The Wonderful Wizard of Oz (1900) where they welcome Dorothy Gale to their city in Oz. The Munchkins are described as being the same height as Dorothy and they wear only shades of blue clothing, as blue is the Munchkins' favorite color. Blue is also the predominating color that officially represents the eastern quadrant in the Land of Oz. The Munchkins have appeared in various media, including the 1939 film The Wizard of Oz, as well as in various other films and comedy acts.

== Concept ==
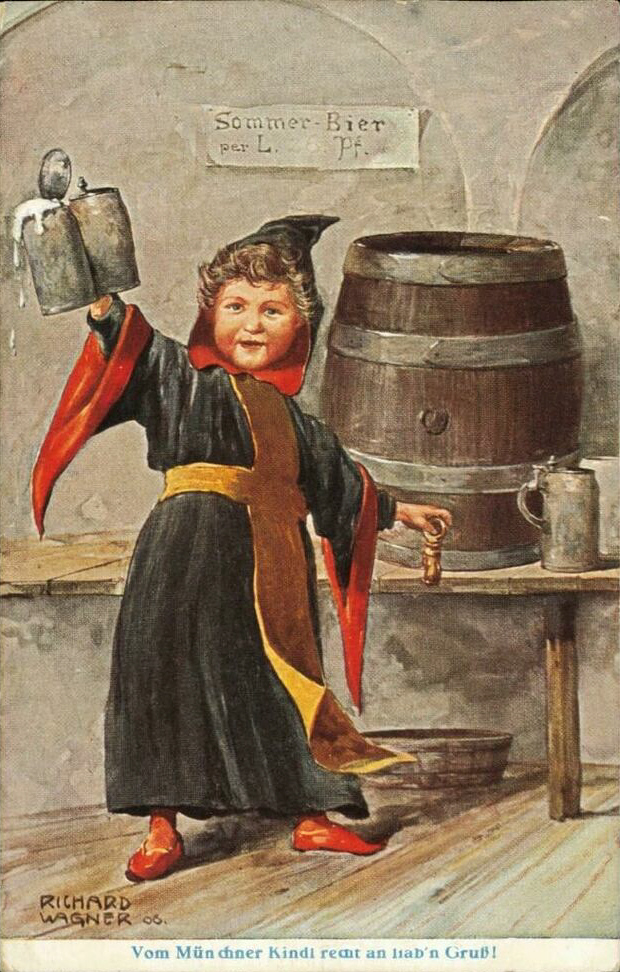
Depiction of the Münchner Kindl in an advertisement c. 1910.

While Baum may have written about it, there are no surviving notes for the composition of The Wonderful Wizard of Oz. The lack of this information has resulted in speculation of the term origins he used in the book, which include the word "Munchkin". Baum researcher Brian Attebery has hypothesized that there might be a connection to the Münchner Kindl ('Munich child'), the emblem of the Bavarian city of Munich. The symbol was originally a 13th-century statue of a monk, looking down from the town hall in Munich. Over the years, the image was reproduced many times, for instance as a figure on beer steins, and eventually evolved into a boy wearing a pointed hood. Baum's family had German origins, suggesting that Baum could have seen one such reproduction in his childhood.

It is also possible that "Munchkin" came from the German word Männchen, which means "mannikin" or "little figure". In 1900, Baum published a book about window displays in which he stressed the importance of mannequins in attracting customers. Another possibility is a connection to Baron Munchausen. This fictional character is based on a real baron who told outrageous tall tales based on his military career. It is also possible that the name is related to Thumbkin, Bumpkin, etc., pet names given to fingers of the hand in nursery rhymes.

Like the other Oz terms, the word "Munchkin" ends in a diminutive which in this case refers to the size of the natives.

== Literature ==
=== Oz Books by Frank Baum ===
"she noticed coming down toward her a group of the queerest people she had ever seen. They were not as big as the grown folk she had always been used to; but neither were they very small. In fact, they seemed about as tall as Dorothy, who was a well-grown child for her age, although they were, so far as looks go, many years older."

— L. Frank Baum

The Munchkins are first mentioned (quote shown) in an excerpt from chapter two of The Wonderful Wizard of Oz, titled "The Council with the Munchkins". Dorothy initially meets only three of them, along with the Good Witch of the North. The rest of the Munchkins then come out of hiding and are shown to be grateful towards Dorothy for killing their evil ruler the Wicked Witch of the East. Dorothy later eventually finds the yellow brick road and along the way attends a banquet held by a Munchkin man named Boq. Sometime in the book a background story is also given about a "Munchkin maiden" (named Nimmie Amee in later books), who was the former love interest of the Tin Woodman.

Baum also included the Munchkin characters in his later works as minor and major individual characters. The Munchkin Jinjur is the main antagonist in Baum's second book The Marvelous Land of Oz, where she seeks to overthrow the Scarecrow and take over the Emerald City. Jinjur makes a brief appearance in the next book, entitled Ozma of Oz, and is brought back in Baum's twelfth book, The Tin Woodman of Oz. By this time, she is shown to be a more prominent character who is helpful and friendly to Dorothy and her friends. Two other major Munchkin characters also appear in The Tin Woodman of Oz: Tommy Kwikstep and Nimmie Amee. The former appears in the story asking for a wish for running an errand for a witch; the latter is the name given to the mystery "Munchkin maiden" from the first book, who was the former lover of the Tin Woodman. More information is revealed that tells about the Tin Woodman's origin and their tragic love story. Lastly, the Munchkin Unc Nunkie appears in Baum's seventh book, The Patchwork Girl of Oz, where he is accidentally turned to stone. His Munchkin nephew Ojo successfully goes on a quest in search of an antidote while learning more about himself in the process.

=== Subsequent Oz books ===
L. Frank Baum died on 6 May 1919 after which other writers took up writing additional Oz stories. In some cases these books were written under Baum's name and included the Munchkins. There is at least one known Munchkin character that was created after Baum's death that appears as a major character. Zif is a Munchkin boy who appears in John R. Neill's first adaptation called The Royal Book of Oz. Zif is a student at the College of Art and Athletic Perfection; he is both respectful and resentful towards his teacher Wogglebog who considers Zif a "nobody or a nothing". The Munchkin characters that Baum had created in his lifetime also appear in these additional works.

== Film and musicals ==
=== Early works (1902–1933) ===
While the 1939 film is the most well known adaptation (see section below), it was not the first outside work to show the Munchkins in film or musical format. One of the first musical adaptations of Baum's books took place in 1902; it was also dubbed The Wizard of Oz. The Munchkins make their appearance in act one, called "The Storm", in which they are shown dancing around their maypole, not noticing that Dorothy's house has fallen to earth killing the Wicked Witch of the East. The first film adaptation of Baum's works, titled The Wonderful Wizard of Oz, was released in 1910, followed by three sequels. However, it was not until 1914 that Munchkin characters first appeared in film works. Ojo the Lucky and Unc Nunkie both appear in a film titled The Patchwork Girl of Oz (based on the book of the same name). This film stars American actress Violet MacMillan as Ojo and was produced by Baum.

=== 1939 film ===
The Munchkins (specifically the "Lollipop Guild") as depicted in the 1939 film The Wizard of Oz. L–R: Jackie Gerlich, Jerry Maren, and Harry Doll.

The 1939 movie musical The Wizard of Oz was loosely based on Baum's novel. Notable differences of the Munchkins include their country name of Munchkinland and their clothes of many colors instead of an all-blue attire. In the musical, the Munchkins are portrayed by the thirty-odd members of the Singer Midgets, a European performing troupe made up of adult actors with dwarfism. Their numbers were swelled when a national talent search brought in a further ninety-four little men, women, and teenagers, with a few average-sized children included as background extras in order to make up the 124 characters requested by MGM.

In the musical, the Munchkins first appear when Dorothy and Toto arrive in the Land of Oz after her house lands on the Wicked Witch of the East. The Munchkins hide from all the commotion until Glinda the Good Witch arrives reassuring them that everything is okay. Dorothy tells them how she arrived in the Land of Oz (through a musical number) and the Munchkins celebrate. To make it official, a Barrister and a number of City Fathers insist to the Mayor of the Munchkin City that they must make sure that the Wicked Witch of the East is really dead before the celebration continues. The Coroner confirms this by saying that the witch is "not only merely dead" but is indeed "most sincerely dead" while showing a Certificate of Death. The Munchkins then celebrate further as Dorothy receives gifts from the "Lullaby League" and the "Lollipop Guild". Near the end of the song, the Wicked Witch of the West arrives, which causes the Munchkins to panic. After the Wicked Witch of the West leaves, Glinda tells Dorothy to follow the yellow brick road to the Emerald City as the Munchkins guide her out of Munchkinland.

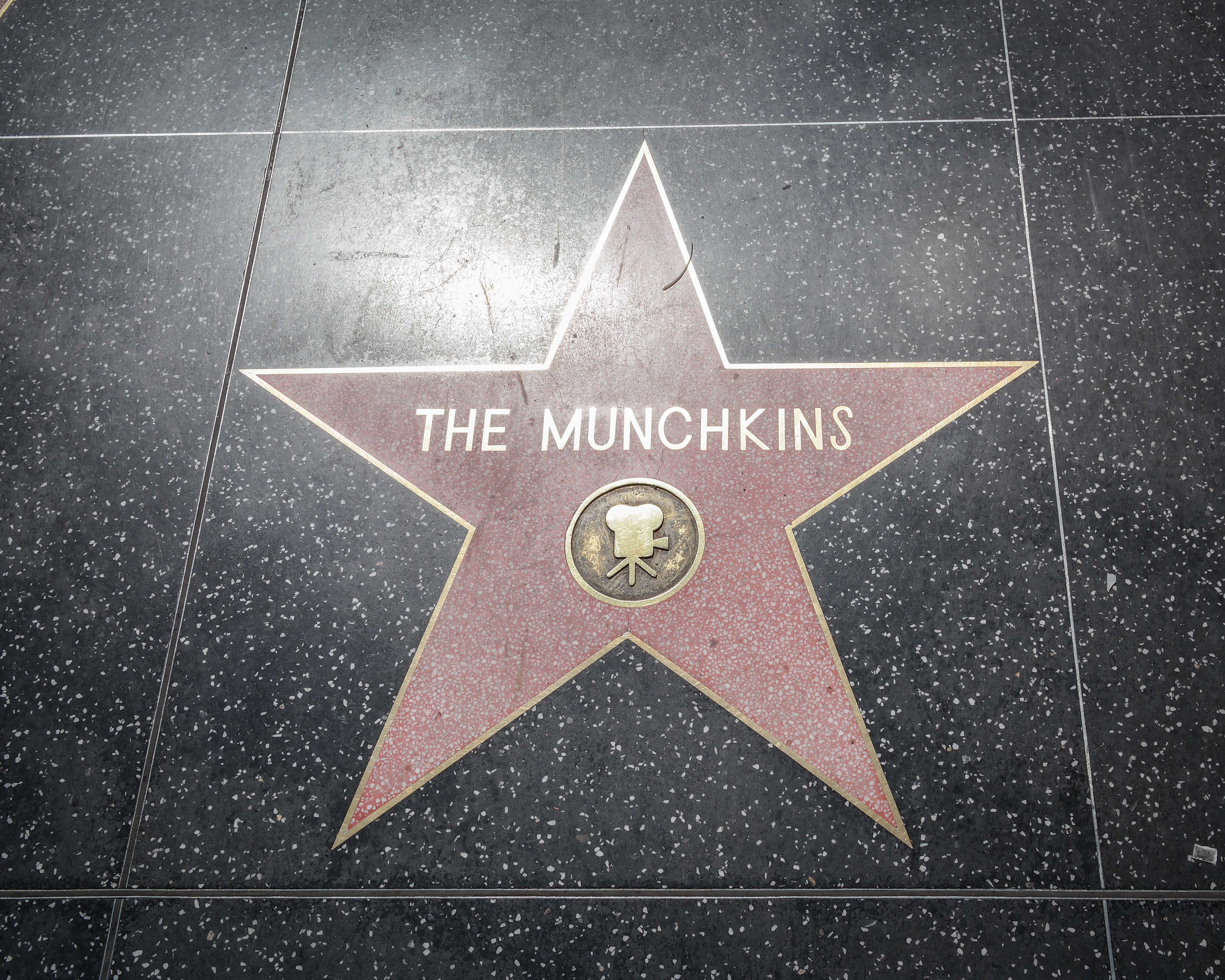
Star on the Hollywood Walk of Fame

The Munchkin actors have since not avoided controversy with alleged behavior behind the scenes. In a 1967 interview, Judy Garland referred to all of the Munchkins as "little drunks" who got intoxicated every night to the point where they had to be picked up in "butterfly nets". These accusations were denied as fabrications by Munchkin Margaret Pellegrini, who said only "a couple of kids from Germany even drank beer". On 20 November 2007, the Munchkins were given a star on the Hollywood Walk of Fame. Seven of the surviving Munchkin actors from the film were present. As a result of the popularity of the 1939 film, the word "munchkin" has entered the English language as a reference to small children, persons with dwarfism, or anything of diminutive stature.

==== Actors and actresses ====
The following is a list of actors who portrayed the Munchkins in the 1939 film. Most of the dwarfs hired were acquired for MGM by Leo Singer, the proprietor of Singer's Midgets. A Daily Variety news story from 17 August 1938, stated 124 dwarves had been signed to play Munchkins; modern sources place the number either at 122 or 124. An additional dozen or so child actors were hired to make up for the shortage of dwarves. At least one Munchkin actor, Dale Paullin (stage name Paul Dale), did not make the final cut for the movie. Only two actors (Joseph Koziel and Frank Cucksey) used their actual voices for the dialogue exchanged with Dorothy where she is given the flowers. The rest of the voices, such as the "Munchkin chorus", were created by Pinto Colvig and Billy Bletcher with their voices recorded at a slow speed, which were subsequently sped-up when played back.

In 1989, author Stephen Cox researched, found, and wrote about the surviving Munchkin actors fifty years after they made the film. He wrote about them in his book, The Munchkins Remember (1989, E.P. Dutton), which was later revised as The Munchkins of Oz (Cumberland House), and his book remained in print for nearly two decades. When he wrote the book, 33 of the actors with dwarfism who appeared in the film were still alive and were interviewed. Several of them outlived all the major cast, as well as the original Tin Man Buddy Ebsen. Jerry Maren, who played the green "Lollipop Guild" member, was the last living adult Munchkin actor. Maren was the only Munchkin alive when the film's longest living cast member, Shep Houghton, an extra, died in 2016.

Notes: Some of the information presented in the table below may never be complete as Social Security records remain sparse prior to the mid-twentieth century. Other factors such as immigration and foreign citizenship also add to this difficulty. Stage names and/or aliases are present in italics and quotation marks.

Actor	Born	Died	Part(s) played
Gladys W. Allison	Unknown	Unknown	Played a villager
John Ballas	1903	Unknown	Played a villager
Franz Balluch ("Mike")	Unknown	1987	Played a villager
Josefine Balluch	Unknown	1984	Played a villager
John T. Bambury	1891	1960	Played a soldier
Charlie Becker	1887	1968	Played "The Mayor of Munchkinland".
Freda Betsky	Unknown	Unknown	Played a villager
Henry Boers	1896	Unknown	Played a villager
Theodore Boers	1894	1945	Played a villager
Christie Buresh ("Kristina Buresova")	1907	Unknown	Played a villager
Eddie Buresh ("Edward Buresova")	1909	Unknown	Played a villager
Lida Buresh ("Ludmila Buresova")	1906	Unknown	Played a villager
Mickey Carroll	1919	2009	Played a fiddler, a town crier, and a soldier
Casper "Colonel" Balsam	1904	1968	Played a villager
Nona A. Cooper	1875	1953	Played a villager
Thomas J. Cottonaro	1914	2001	Played a villager
Elizabeth Coulter	Unknown	Unknown	Played a villager
Lewis Croft	1919	2008	Played a soldier
Frank Cucksey	1919	1984	Played a villager who gives Dorothy flowers (Note: Frank Cucksey, and Joseph Koziel were the only two munchkins whose real voices were used. Their dialogue is as follows: "We thank you very sweetly, for doing it so neatly" (Joseph), "You've killed her so completely, that we thank you very sweetly" (Frank).)
Billy Curtis	1909	1988	Played the Braggart (Note: The "Braggart" can be heard saying: "and ohhhh what happened then was rich".)
Eugene S. David Jr.	Unknown	Unknown	Played a fiddler
Eulie H. David	1921	1972	Played a soldier
Ethel W. Denis	1894	1968	Played a villager
Prince Denis	1900	1984	Played the Sergeant-at-Arms (Note: It was falsely reported in 1984 that Prince Denis played the role of the Munchkin Mayor.)
Hazel I. Derthick	1906	Unknown	Played a villager
Daisy Earles	1907	1980	Played a "munchkin maiden"
Gracie Doll Earles	1899	1970	Played a "munchkin maiden"
Harry Doll Earles	1902	1985	Blue member of The Lollipop Guild
Tiny Doll Earles	1914	2004	Played a "munchkin maiden"
Major Doyle ("James D. Doyle")	1869	1940	Played a villager
Ruth Robinson Duccini	1918	2014	Played a villager
Carl M. Erickson	1917	1958	Played the 2nd Trumpeter
Fern Formica	1925	Unknown	Played a villager and a "sleepyhead"
Addie Eva Frank	Unknown	Unknown	Played a villager
Thaisa L. Gardner	Unknown	Unknown	Played a villager
Jakob "Jackie" Gerlich	1925 (Note: Although often disputed as 1917 or 1925, Gerlich was born Leo Fuks in 1925, but used the passport of his older brother, Jakob Gerlich (born 1917) in order to emigrate to the U.S. at age thirteen; he continued using his older brother's name post-Oz.)	1960	Red member of The Lollipop Guild
William A. Giblin	1916	1985	Played a soldier
Jack S. Glicken	1900	1950	Played a city father
Carolyn E. Granger	1915	1973	Played a villager
Joseph Herbst	1908	Disputed (Note: According to Stephen Cox, Herbst was born in Birkfeld Austria on April 19, 1908 and died on July 6, 1993 in Joliet, Illinois. However this contradicts claims made by Joseph Herbst's cousin who claimed he died in 1989 and was in his "late 80s" in 1988.)	Played a soldier
Jakob Hofbauer	1898	Unknown (Note: According to Stephen Cox it is unknown what became of Jakob Hofbauer; he is rumored to have died in the late 1950s.)	Played a soldier
Clarence C. Howerton ("Major Mite")	1913	1975	Played the 3rd Trumpeter
Helen M. Hoy	1898	1945	Played a villager
Marguerite A. Hoy	Unknown	Unknown	Played a villager
James R. Hulse IV	1915	1964	Played a villager
Robert Kanter ("Little Lord Robert")	1886 (Note: There is a source that mentions Robert Kanter aka "Little Lord Robert" signing a postcard in 1908 when he was 22 years old. This means he was born in 1886 at the latest.)	Unknown	Played a soldier
Charles E. Kelley	Unknown	Unknown	Played a soldier
Jessie E. Kelley ("Jessie Becker")	Unknown	Unknown	Played a villager
Frank Kikel	Unknown	Unknown	Played a villager
Bernard Klima ("Harry")	1897	1957	Played a villager
Mitzi Koestner	1894	1975	Played a villager
Emma Koestner	1900	1984	Played a villager
Willi Koestner	1908	1974	Played a soldier
Adam Edwin Kozicki ("Eddie Adams")	Unknown	Unknown	Played a fiddler
Joseph J. Koziel	1919	1967	Played a villager who gives Dorothy flowers
Dolly F. Kramer	1904	1995	Played a villager
Emil Kranzler	1910	1993	Played a villager
Nita Krebs	1905	1991	Member of The Lullaby League and a villager
Jeane LaBarbera ("Little Jean")	1909	1993	Played a villager
Hilda Lange	1911	1975	Played a villager
John Leal ("Johnny")	1905	1996	Played a villager
Ann Rice Leslie	1900	1973	Played a villager
Charles Ludwig	1889	1941	Played a villager
Dominick Magro	1909	1959	Played a villager
Carlos Manzo	1915	1955	Played a villager
Howard Marco	1884	Unknown	Played a villager
Jerry Maren	1920	2018	Green member of The Lollipop Guild
Bela Matina ("Mike Rogers")	1902	1954	Played a villager
Lajos Matina ("Leo Rogers")	1893	1975	Played a villager
Matyus Matina ("Ike Rogers")	1902	1965	Played a villager
Walter M. B. Miller	1906	1987	Played a soldier and a flying monkey
George Ministeri	1906	1986	Played the coachman and a villager
Harry Monty	1904	1999	Played a villager and a flying monkey
Yvonne Bistany Moray	Unknown	Unknown (Note: According to friends, Yvonne died sometime in the 1970s.)	Member of The Lullaby League and a villager
Johnny Maroldo ("Johnny Winters")	1905	1985	Played the Commander of the Navy
Marie Bernadet Maroldo ("Marie Winters")	1901	1979	Played a villager
Olga C. Nardone	1921	2010	Member of The Lullaby League, and a sleepyhead.
Nels P. Nelson (Note: Nels was interviewed in the 1993 documentary "We're off to see the munchkins".)	1918	1994	Played a villager
Margaret C. Nickloy ("Princess Marguerite")	1902	1961	Played a villager
Franklin H. O'Baugh	1922	1963	Played a soldier
William H. O'Docharty	1920	1988	Played the coach footman and a villager
Hildred C. Olson	1906	1958	Played a villager
Frank Packard	Unknown	Unknown	Played a villager
Nicholas Page ("Nicky")	1904	1978	Played a soldier and a city father
Leona Megest Parks ("Duchess Leona")	1897	Unknown	Played a villager
Margaret Williams Pellegrini	1923	2013	Played a "sleepyhead" and the "flower pot munchkin".
Johnny Pizo	Unknown	Unknown	Played a villager
Leon Polinsky ("Prince Leon")	1918	1955	Played a villager
Lillian Porter	1917	1997	Played a villager
Meinhardt Raabe	1915	2010	Played the coroner (Note: Raabe certifies the death of the Wicked Witch of the East.)
Margaret Raia	1928 (Note: During production, MGM officials discovered that Raia was underage (child actresses were hired for background fill). She was subsequently expelled from the set halfway through filming.)	2003	Played a villager
Matthew Raia	Unknown	Unknown	Played a city father
Friedrich Retter ("Freddie")	1899	Unknown	Played a fiddler and villager
Billy Rhodes ("Little Billy")	1895	1967	Played the barrister
Gertrude H. Rice	Unknown	Unknown	Played a villager
Hazel Rice	Unknown	Unknown	Played a villager
Sandor Roka	1896	1954	Played a villager
Jimmie Rosen	1892	1973	Played a villager
Charles F. "Wojnarski" Royal	1900	1947	Played a soldier
Helen J. "Wojnarski" Royal	1897	1958	Played a villager
Stella A. "Wojnarski" Royal	1903	1959	Played a villager
Albert Ruddinger	Unknown	Unknown	Played a villager
Elsie R. Schultz	1892	1987	Played a villager
Charles Silvern	Unknown	1976	Played a villager
Garland Slatton ("Earl")	1917	1995	Played a soldier
Karl Slover	1918	2011	Played the lead trumpeter, a soldier, and a villager
Ruth E. Smith	Unknown	1985	Played a villager
Elmer Spangler	1910	Unknown	Played a villager
Pernell St. Aubin	1922	1987	Played a soldier
Carl Stephan	Unknown	Unknown	Played a villager
Alta M. Stevens	Unknown	Unknown	Played a villager
George Suchsie	Unknown	Unknown	Played a villager
Charlotte V. Sullivan	Unknown	Unknown	Played a villager
Clarence Swensen	1917	2009	Played a soldier
Betty Tanner	Unknown	1994	Played a villager
Arnold Vierling	1919	1949	Played a villager
Gus Wayne	1920	1998	Played a soldier
Victor Wetter	1902	1990	Played the Captain of the Army
Grace G. Williams	Unknown	Unknown	Played a villager
Harvey B. Williams	Unknown	Unknown	Played a soldier
Gladys V. Wolff	1911	1984	Played a villager
Murray Wood	1908	1999	Played a city father

==== Child actresses ====
About a dozen children of average height were hired so they could be used for background fill. Sources differ on the number of children used for these roles ranging anywhere from 10 to 12. The names used for the women are maiden names with known aliases present in italics and quotation marks.

Priscilla Ann Montgomery Clark is the earliest born of the Munchkins listed below and the final living Munchkin actress.

Actor	Born	Died	Part(s) played	Source
Betty Ann Cain ("Bruno")	1931	2023	Munchkin hatchling	
Priscilla Ann Montgomery Clark	1929	Living	Munchkin Child	
Donna Jean Johnson ("Stewart Hardaway")	1933	2008	Background fill	
Joan Kenmore	1931	2022	Background fill	
Eva Lee Kuney	1934	2015	Background fill	
Rae-Nell Laskey ("Alsbury")	1930	1991	unknown	
Elaine Mirk ("Merk")	1930	2025	Background fill	
Valerie Lee Shepard (Note: Also known as "Lois Valerie Shepard".)	1931	2026	Background fill	
Ardith Dondanville ("Mae") Todd	1930	2022	Background fill	
Shirley Ann Kennedy ("Vegors")	1932	2005	Background fill	
Viola White ("Banks")	1931	2000	Background fill	

=== Later works (1940–1989) ===
The 1939 film was adapted into a musical that was released in 1942 that includes the Munchkin characters. The events that take place mirror the film including the song "Ding-Dong! The Witch Is Dead". Twenty-seven years later an animated film called The Wonderful Land of Oz was made featuring Jinjur as a main antagonist.

=== Other works ===
- The Munchkins appeared in The Wiz and were played by children and teenagers. (1978)
- The Munchkins appear at the end of Return to Oz. They are seen celebrating Dorothy's return after defeating the Nome King and are present at Princess Ozma's coronation. Tommy Kwikstep was also seen there. (1985)
- In The Muppets' Wizard of Oz, the Munchkins were played by Rizzo the Rat (as the "Mayor of Munchkinland") and his fellow rats, allowing them to also pull double duty as the Field Mice that rescue Dorothy from the poppies. (2005)
- The Munchkins appeared in Dorothy and the Witches of Oz. The Munchkins were first seen in the battle against the Wicked Witch of the West's forces in Oz. They were later brought to Earth by Glinda in order to combat the forces of the Wicked Witch of the West. (2012)
- The Munchkins appear in Oz the Great and Powerful. They alongside the Quadlings and the Tinkers as inhabitants of Glinda's protectorate. Although the film is not otherwise a musical, the Munchkins sing and dance much as they do in the 1939 film. (2013)
- The Munchkins appear in Dorothy and the Wizard of Oz with the "Mayor of Munchkinland" voiced by Bill Fagerbakke and the background Munchkins voiced by Steven Blum and Jessica DiCicco. Ojo, Dr. Pipt, the Lollipop Guild, and the Lullaby League are also featured. Also, Smith & Tinker are depicted as Munchkins in this show.
- The Munchkins appear as a culture of farmers in Wicked. Director Jon M. Chu decided to cast people closer to the book's original description being about as tall as Dorothy, rather than the 1939 film's cast of much shorter Munchkins. The main Munchkin character in this story, Boq Woodsman, is played by Ethan Slater who stands at 5'7". Chu also chose to focus more on their culture than their physical appearance.
