= Mickey Carroll =

American actor (1919–2009)

- Born: Michael Finocchiaro; July 8, 1919; St. Louis, Missouri, U.S.
- Died: May 7, 2009 (aged 89); Crestwood, Missouri, U.S.
- Occupation: Actor
- Years active: 1936–1939; 2007

Mickey Carroll (born Michael Finocchiaro; July 8, 1919 – May 7, 2009) was an American actor who worked in radio and film, and was one of the last surviving actors who portrayed a Munchkin in the 1939 film The Wizard of Oz.

== Early life and career ==
Born Michael Finocchiaro in St. Louis, Missouri, Carroll was the son of Italian immigrants. He was born along with a twin sister, who, unlike Carroll, was of average size.

As a child Carroll began dance lessons at the Fox Theater in St. Louis. At 17 he was one of six bellhops in the "Call for Phillip Morris" live radio ads, and at 18 was appearing in shows with Mae West.

While under contract to MGM, he went to school with Judy Garland and Mickey Rooney. It was Garland herself who offered him a part in The Wizard of Oz. Carroll was cast as Munchkinland's "Town Crier". His costume consisted of a purple cloak with a yellow flower sticking out of his striped vest. He also marched as a "Munchkin Soldier", and as one of the candy-striped "Fiddlers" who escorted Dorothy down the yellow brick road towards the Emerald City.

Soon after the success of the film, Carroll left show business. In the mid-1940s, he returned to St. Louis to run the family business making cemetery monuments, known as Standard Monument Company (founded 1911), which operated a shop and showroom on St. Charles Rock Road in Wellston. After Carroll sold it in 1996, he filled his time with charity work.

In November 2007, Carroll, along with six of the other remaining Munchkins, received a star on the Hollywood Walk of Fame. Thanks to the popularity of The Wizard of Oz, Carroll made many appearances that year, serving as a grand marshal in parades, appearing on nationwide radio and TV shows, and signing thousands of autographs for fans. He helped raise money for several different charities.

== Death ==
On May 7, 2009, Carroll died in his sleep at the home of his caretaker in Crestwood, Missouri. He had a heart ailment and complications from Alzheimer's disease. After his death, his family sued his caretaker, to whom Carroll had transferred all assets four months before his death.

After a funeral Mass at the New Cathedral Basilica of St. Louis on Lindell Blvd., he was entombed at Calvary Cemetery Shrine Mausoleum in St. Louis.

== Filmography ==
Year	Title	Role	Notes
1938	Gold Diggers in Paris	Actor	Uncredited
1939	The Wizard of Oz	Munchkin Fiddler	Uncredited, final film role
