= List of American films of 2013 =

This is a list of American films released in 2013.

== Box office ==
The highest-grossing American films released in 2013, by domestic box office gross revenue, are as follows:

Highest-grossing films of 2013
Rank	Title	Distributor	Domestic gross
1	The Hunger Games: Catching Fire	Lionsgate	$424,668,047
2	Iron Man 3	Disney	$409,013,994
3	Frozen	Disney	$400,738,009
4	Despicable Me 2	Universal	$368,065,385
5	Man of Steel	Warner Bros.	$291,045,518
6	Gravity	Warner Bros.	$274,092,705
7	Monsters University	Disney	$268,492,764
8	The Hobbit: The Desolation of Smaug	Warner Bros.	$258,366,855
9	Fast & Furious 6	Universal	$238,679,850
10	Oz the Great and Powerful	Disney	$234,911,825

== January–March ==
Opening		Title	Production company	Cast and crew	Ref.
J A N U A R Y	4	A Dark Truth	Magnolia Pictures	Damian Lee (director/screenwriter); Andy García, Kim Coates, Deborah Kara Unger, Alec Rayme, David Anders, Henry Kingi, Eva Longoria, Forest Whitaker, Devon Bostick, Steven Bauer, Al Sapienza, Kevin Durand, Jim Calarco, Millie Davis	
J A N U A R Y	4	Texas Chainsaw 3D	Lionsgate / Millennium Films	John Luessenhop (director); Adam Marcus, Debra Sullivan, Kirsten Elms (screenplay); Alexandra Daddario, Dan Yeager, Tremaine "Trey Songz" Neverson, Tania Raymonde, Thom Barry, Paul Rae, Bill Moseley, Gunnar Hansen, Scott Eastwood, Shaun Sipos, Keram Malicki-Sánchez, James MacDonald, Richard Riehle, Marilyn Burns, John Dugan, David Born, Sue Rock, Ritchie Montgomery, Dodie L. Brown, David "Bear" Bell	
J A N U A R Y	11	The Baytown Outlaws	Phase 4 Films	Barry Battles (director/screenplay); Griffin Hood (screenplay); Andre Braugher, Clayne Crawford, Daniel Cudmore, Travis Fimmel, Eva Longoria, Paul Wesley, Billy Bob Thornton, Thomas Sangster, Zoë Bell, Serinda Swan, Arden Cho, Brea Grant, Agnes Bruckner, J. LaRose, Julio Oscar Mechoso, John McConnell, J.D. Evermore, Michael Rapaport, Natalie Martinez, Damien Moses, Nito Larioza, Bill Perkins, Quinn Early, Keith Woulard, Tim J. Smith, Sam Medina, John Paul Shellnut, Javier Carrasquillo, Griffin Hood, Ritchie Montgomery, James DuMont	
J A N U A R Y	11	Freeloaders	Myriad Pictures	Dan Rosen (director/screenplay); Dave Gibbs (screenplay); Josh Lawson, Kevin Sussman, Zoe Boyle, Nat Faxon, Warren Hutcherson, Brit Morgan, Clifton Collins Jr., Jane Seymour, Olivia Munn, Dave Foley, Adam Duritz, Denise Richards, Richard Branson, Jay Chandrasekhar, Paul Soter, Kevin Heffernan, Steve Lemme, Erik Stolhanske	
J A N U A R Y	11	Gangster Squad	Warner Bros. Pictures / Village Roadshow Pictures	Ruben Fleischer (director); Will Beall (screenplay); Josh Brolin, Ryan Gosling, Sean Penn, Nick Nolte, Emma Stone, Anthony Mackie, Giovanni Ribisi, Michael Peña, Robert Patrick, Mireille Enos, Troy Garity, Holt McCallany, Sullivan Stapleton, James Carpinello, Evan Jones, Josh Pence, John Aylward, Jack Conley, Jack McGee, Jon Polito, Wade Williams, Ambyr Childers, Mick Betancourt, Mac Brandt, Michael Papajohn, Austin Abrams, Lucy Davenport, Haley Strode, Maxwell Perry Cotton, Frank Grillo, Lucy Walsh, James Hébert, Brandon Molale, Jeff Wolfe, Anthony Molinari, Austin Highsmith, Neil Koppel, Dennis Cockrum	
J A N U A R Y	11	A Haunted House	Open Road Films	Michael Tiddes (director); Marlon Wayans, Rick Alvarez (screenplay); Marlon Wayans, Essence Atkins, Cedric the Entertainer, Nick Swardson, David Koechner, Dave Sheridan, Marlene Forte, Andrew Daly, Alanna Ubach, Affion Crockett, Robin Thede, J.B. Smoove	
J A N U A R Y	11	Struck by Lightning	Tribeca Film	Brian Dannelly (director); Chris Colfer (screenplay); Chris Colfer, Allison Janney, Christina Hendricks, Sarah Hyland, Carter Jenkins, Brad William Henke, Rebel Wilson, Angela Kinsey, Polly Bergen, Dermot Mulroney, Allie Grant, Ashley Rickards, Robbie Amell, Charlie Finn, Roberto Aguire, Matt Prokop, Graham Rogers, Michael Van London	
J A N U A R Y	18	Broken City	20th Century Fox / Regency Enterprises / Emmett/Furla Oasis Films	Allen Hughes (director); Brian Tucker (screenplay); Mark Wahlberg, Russell Crowe, Catherine Zeta-Jones, Barry Pepper, Kyle Chandler, Natalie Martinez, Jeffrey Wright, Alona Tal, Michael Beach, James Ransone, Griffin Dunne, Justin Chambers, Gregory Jbara, Dana Gourrier	
J A N U A R Y	18	The Last Stand	Lionsgate	Kim Ji-woon (director); Andrew Knauer (screenplay); Arnold Schwarzenegger, Forest Whitaker, Johnny Knoxville, Rodrigo Santoro, Jaimie Alexander, Luis Guzmán, Eduardo Noriega, Peter Stormare, Zach Gilford, Genesis Rodriguez, Daniel Henney, Tait Fletcher, John Patrick Amedori	
J A N U A R Y	18	LUV	Indomina Media	Sheldon Candis (director/screenplay); Common, Michael Rainey Jr., Charles S. Dutton, Meagan Good, Marc John Jefferies, Lonette McKee, Michael K. Williams, Tracey Heggins, Clark Johnson, Russell Hornsby, Sammi Rotibi, Dennis Haysbert, Danny Glover, Marz Lovejoy	
J A N U A R Y	18	Officer Down	Anchor Bay Films	Brian A. Miller (director); John Chase (screenplay); Stephen Dorff, Dominic Purcell, David Boreanaz, AnnaLynne McCord, Soulja Boy, Stephen Lang, James Woods, Walton Goggins, Tommy Flanagan, Oleg Taktarov, Elisabeth Röhm, Brette Taylor, Laura Harris, Johnny Messner, Kamaliya, Bea Miller, Bree Michael Warner, Zoran Radanovich, Jas Anderson, Marisa Pierinias, A.K. Debris, Misha Kuznetsov	
J A N U A R Y	25	Hansel & Gretel: Witch Hunters	Paramount Pictures / Metro-Goldwyn-Mayer / MTV Films / Gary Sanchez Productions	Tommy Wirkola (director/screenplay); Dante Harper (screenplay); Jeremy Renner, Gemma Arterton, Famke Janssen, Peter Stormare, Thomas Mann, Derek Mears, Pihla Viitala, Rainer Bock, Bjørn Sundquist, Ingrid Bolsø Berdal, Joanna Kulig, Robin Atkin Downes	
J A N U A R Y	25	John Dies at the End	Magnolia Pictures	Don Coscarelli (director/screenplay); Chase Williamson, Rob Mayes, Paul Giamatti, Clancy Brown, Glynn Turman, Doug Jones, Daniel Roebuck, Fabianne Therese, Jonny Weston, Allison Weissman, Jimmy Wong, Tai Bennett, Ethan Erickson, Angus Scrimm, Kevin Michael Richardson	
J A N U A R Y	25	Knife Fight	IFC Films	Bill Guttentag (director/screenplay); Chris Lehane (screenplay); Rob Lowe, Carrie-Anne Moss, Jamie Chung, Richard Schiff, Amanda Crew, Julie Bowen, Ryan Alosio, Saffron Burrows, David Harbour, Eric McCormack, Jennifer Morrison, Lorraine Toussaint, Michelle Krusiec, Chris Mulkey, Davey Havok, Eddie George, Kurt Yaeger, Shirley Manson, Brandon Scott, Frankie Shaw	
J A N U A R Y	25	Movie 43	Relativity Media / Rogue Pictures	Will Graham, Jonathan van Tulleken, Patrik Forsberg, James Gunn, Bob Odenkirk, Steve Baker (directors/screenplay); Steven Brill, Peter Farrelly, Steve Carr, Griffin Dunne, James Duffy, Elizabeth Banks, Brett Ratner, Rusty Cundieff, Damon Escott (directors); Ricky Blitt, Will Carlough, Tobias Carlson, Jacob Fleisher, Claes Kjellstrom, Jack Kukoda, Bill O'Malley, Matthew Alec Portenoy, Greg Pritikin, Rocky Russo, Olle Sarri, Elizabeth Wright Shapiro, Jeremy Sosenko, Jonas Wittenmark (screenplay); Elizabeth Banks, Kristen Bell, Halle Berry, Leslie Bibb, Kate Bosworth, Gerard Butler, Josh Duhamel, Anna Faris, Richard Gere, Terrence Howard, Hugh Jackman, Johnny Knoxville, Justin Long, Christopher Mintz-Plasse, Chloë Grace Moretz, Chris Pratt, Liev Schreiber, Emma Stone, Jason Sudeikis, Uma Thurman, Naomi Watts, Kate Winslet, Dennis Quaid, Greg Kinnear, Common, Charlie Saxton, Will Sasso, Seth MacFarlane, Mark L. Young, Fisher Stevens, Beth Littleford, Julie Claire, Katie Finneran, Jeremy Allen White, Julie Ann Emery, J.B. Smoove, Jarrad Paul, Kieran Culkin, Arthur French, Jack McBrayer, Aasif Mandvi, Bobby Cannavale, John Hodgman, Katrina Bowden, Jimmy Bennett, Patrick Warburton, Matt Walsh, Seann William Scott, Esti Ginzburg, Stephen Merchant, Sayed Badreya, Nicole "Snooki" Polizzi, Ricki Noel Lander, Zen Gesner, Corey Brewer, Jared Dudley, Larry Sanders, Jay Ellis, Brett Davern, Eric Stuart, Emily Alyn Lind, Christina Linhardt, Julianne Moore, Tony Shalhoub, Bob Odenkirk, Anton Yelchin, Shane Jacobson	
J A N U A R Y	25	Parker	FilmDistrict	Taylor Hackford (director); John J. McLaughlin (screenplay); Jason Statham, Jennifer Lopez, Michael Chiklis, Bobby Cannavale, Nick Nolte, Wendell Pierce, Clifton Collins Jr., Patti LuPone, Carlos Carrasco, Micah Hauptman, Emma Booth	
J A N U A R Y	25	Supporting Characters	Tribeca Productions	Daniel Schechter (director/screenplay); Tarik Lowe (screenplay); Alex Karpovsky, Tarik Lowe, Arielle Kebbel, Melonie Diaz, Sophia Takal	
F E B R U A R Y	1	Bullet to the Head	Warner Bros. Pictures / Dark Castle Entertainment / IM Global	Walter Hill (director); Alessandro Camon (screenplay); Sylvester Stallone, Sung Kang, Sarah Shahi, Adewale Akinnuoye-Agbaje, Christian Slater, Jason Momoa, Jon Seda, Weronika Rosati, Holt McCallany, Dane Rhodes, Marcus Lyle Brown	
F E B R U A R Y	1	The Haunting in Connecticut 2: Ghosts of Georgia	Lionsgate / Gold Circle Films	Tom Elkins (director); Dave Coggeshall (screenplay); Abigail Spencer, Chad Michael Murray, Katee Sackhoff, Emily Alyn Lind, Cicely Tyson	
F E B R U A R Y	1	Sound City	Therapy Studios	Dave Grohl (director); Mark Monroe (screenplay)	
F E B R U A R Y	1	Stand Up Guys	Lionsgate / Sidney Kimmel Entertainment / Lakeshore Entertainment	Fisher Stevens (director); Noah Haidle (screenplay); Al Pacino, Christopher Walken, Alan Arkin, Julianna Margulies, Mark Margolis, Lucy Punch, Addison Timlin, Vanessa Ferlito, Katheryn Winnick, Bill Burr, Craig Sheffer, Yorgo Constantine, Weronika Rosati, Keone Young, Lauriane Gilliéron, Arjun Gupta, Brandon Scott, Eric Etebari, Eve Brenner, Jay Bulger, Donnie Smith, Rick Gomez, Franklin Ruehl	
F E B R U A R Y	1	Warm Bodies	Summit Entertainment / Mandeville Films	Jonathan Levine (director/screenplay); Nicholas Hoult, Teresa Palmer, Rob Corddry, Dave Franco, Lio Tipton, (Note: Credited as Analeigh Tipton) Cory Hardrict, John Malkovich	
F E B R U A R Y	8	A Glimpse Inside the Mind of Charles Swan III	A24	Roman Coppola (director/screenplay); Charlie Sheen, Katheryn Winnick, Bill Murray, Jason Schwartzman, Patricia Arquette, Mary Elizabeth Winstead, Fabianne Therese, Aubrey Plaza, Dermot Mulroney, Richard Edson, Stephen Dorff, Angela Lindvall, Tyne Stecklein, Lexy Hulme, Bar Paly, Maxine Bahns, Alim Kouliev, Liam Hayes, C.C. Sheffield, Lindsey McLevis, Margarita Kallas	
F E B R U A R Y	8	Identity Thief	Universal Pictures / Relativity Media / Bluegrass Films	Seth Gordon (director); Craig Mazin (screenplay); Jason Bateman, Melissa McCarthy, Jon Favreau, Amanda Peet, Tip "T.I." Harris, Genesis Rodriguez, Morris Chestnut, John Cho, Robert Patrick, Eric Stonestreet, Mary-Charles Jones, Maggie Elizabeth Jones, Jonathan Banks, Carlos Navarro, Ben Falcone, Kevin Covais, Ellie Kemper, Carmela Zumbado, Clark Duke, Ryan Gaul, Steve Little, Andrew Friedman, Sope Aluko, Nelson Bonilla, Steve Witting, Gary Weeks, Cullen Moss	
F E B R U A R Y	8	Side Effects	Open Road Films / Endgame Entertainment / Di Bonaventura Pictures	Steven Soderbergh (director); Scott Z. Burns (screenplay); Jude Law, Rooney Mara, Catherine Zeta-Jones, Channing Tatum, Polly Draper, Vinessa Shaw, Ann Dowd, Marin Ireland, James Martinez, Michelle Vergara Moore, Katie Lowes, David Costabile, Mamie Gummer, Elizabeth Rodriguez, Peter Friedman, Laila Robins, Scott Shepherd, Michael Nathanson, Josh Elliott, Devin Ratray, Johnny Sanchez, LaChanze, Craig muMs Grant, Anthony J. Ribustello	
F E B R U A R Y	8	Top Gun 3D	Paramount Pictures	Tony Scott (director); Jim Cash, Jack Epps Jr. (screenplay); Tom Cruise, Kelly McGillis, Val Kilmer, Anthony Edwards, Tom Skerritt, Michael Ironside, John Stockwell, Barry Tubb, Rick Rossovich, Tim Robbins, James Tolkan, Meg Ryan, Clarence Gilyard, Whip Hubley, Adrian Pasdar	
F E B R U A R Y	14	Beautiful Creatures	Warner Bros. Pictures / Alcon Entertainment	Richard LaGravenese (director/screenplay); Alden Ehrenreich, Alice Englert, Jeremy Irons, Viola Davis, Emmy Rossum, Thomas Mann, Emma Thompson, Eileen Atkins, Margo Martindale, Zoey Deutch, Tiffany Boone, Rachel Brosnahan, Kyle Gallner, Pruitt Taylor Vince, Lance E. Nichols, J.D. Evermore, Lucy Faust, Justine Wachsberger, Teri Wyble	
F E B R U A R Y	14	A Good Day to Die Hard	20th Century Fox	John Moore (director); Skip Woods (screenplay); Bruce Willis, Jai Courtney, Sebastian Koch, Yuliya Snigir, Rasha Bukvić, Cole Hauser, Amaury Nolasco, Sergei Kolesnikov, Mary Elizabeth Winstead, Roman Luknár, Pasha D. Lychnikoff, Megalyn Echikunwoke, Melissa Tang, Ferenc Elek, Ivan Fenyo, Scott Michael Campbell, Aldis Hodge, Jesse Burch, Justin Smith, Ivan Kamaras, Mike Dopud, Anne Vyalitsyna, Rico Simonini, Catherine Kresge, April Grace, Cooper Thornton, Joe Massingill	
F E B R U A R Y	14	Safe Haven	Relativity Media	Lasse Hallström (director); Gage Lansky, Dana Stevens (screenplay); Josh Duhamel, Julianne Hough, Cobie Smulders, David Lyons, Noah Lomax, Red West, Cullen Moss, Mike Pniewski, Mimi Kirkland, Irene Ziegler, Robin Mullins, Juan Carlos Piedrahita	
F E B R U A R Y	15	Escape from Planet Earth	The Weinstein Company / Rainmaker Entertainment	Cal Brunker (director/screenplay); Bob Barlen (screenplay); Rob Corddry, Brendan Fraser, Sarah Jessica Parker, William Shatner, Jessica Alba, Jane Lynch, Craig Robinson, George Lopez, Sofía Vergara, Steve Zahn, Chris Parnell, Jonathan Morgan Heit, Ricky Gervais, Joshua Rush, Paul Scheer, Trevor Devall, Brian Dobson, Gabe Khouth, Kirby Morrow, Adrian Petriw, Kaitlin Olson, Bob Bergen, Jim Ward, Cooper Barnes, Daran Norris, Michael Dobson, Gregg Binkley, Lucy Davenport, Bill Hader	
F E B R U A R Y	22	Bless Me, Ultima	Arenas Entertainment	Carl Franklin (director/screenplay); Luke Ganalon, Míriam Colón	
F E B R U A R Y	22	Dark Skies	Dimension Films / Alliance Films / Blumhouse Productions	Scott Stewart (director/screenplay); Keri Russell, Josh Hamilton, Dakota Goyo, J.K. Simmons, Myndy Crist, Annie Thurman, Ron Ostrow, Brian Stepanek, Trevor St. John, Alyvia Alyn Lind, Josh Stamberg, Andy Umberger, Michael Patrick McGill, Josh Wingate, Kadan Rockett, L.J. Benet, Rich Hutchman, Jack Washburn, Cary Quattrocchi, Judith Moreland	
F E B R U A R Y	22	Snitch	Summit Entertainment / Exclusive Media / Participant Media / Image Nation	Ric Roman Waugh (director/screenplay); Justin Haythe (screenplay); Dwayne Johnson, Barry Pepper, Jon Bernthal, Michael K. Williams, Melina Kanakaredes, Nadine Velazquez, Rafi Gavron, David Harbour, Benjamin Bratt, Susan Sarandon, Harold Perrineau, Kyara Campos, Jason Douglas, Richard Cabral, James Allen McCune, J.D. Pardo, Kym Jackson, Lela Loren	
M A R C H	1	21 & Over	Relativity Media / Mandeville Films / Virgin Produced	Jon Lucas, Scott Moore (directors/screenplay); Miles Teller, Skylar Astin, Justin Chon, Sarah Wright, Francois Chau, Jonathan Keltz, Russell Hodgkinson, Daniel Booko, Josie Loren, Samantha Futerman, Dustin Ybarra, Eddy Martin, Christian Castellanos, Jeremiah Sird	
M A R C H	1	Jack the Giant Slayer	Warner Bros. Pictures / New Line Cinema / Legendary Pictures / Original Film / Bad Hat Harry Productions	Bryan Singer (director); Darren Lemke, Christopher McQuarrie, Dan Studney (screenplay); Nicholas Hoult, Eleanor Tomlinson, Stanley Tucci, Ian McShane, Bill Nighy, Ewan McGregor, Eddie Marsan, Ewen Bremner, Ralph Brown, John Kassir, Cornell John, Andrew Brooke, Angus Barnett, Ben Daniels, Christopher Fairbank, Simon Lowe, Warwick Davis, Peter Bonner, Lee Boardman, Lee Whitlock, Peter Elliott, Don McCorkindale, Tayler Marshall, Alex Macqueen, Steven Williams, John Lebar, Tandi Wright, Annabelle Davis, Caroline Hayes, Kevin Hudson, Daniel Lapaine, Paul Warren	
M A R C H	1	The Last Exorcism Part II	CBS Films	Ed Gass-Donnelly (director/screenplay); Damien Chazelle (screenplay); Ashley Bell, Julia Garner, Spencer Treat Clark, David Jensen, Tarra Riggs, Louis Herthum, Muse Watson, Joe Chrest, E. Roger Mitchell, Deacon John Moore, Boyana Balta, Erica Michelle, Sharice Angelle Williams, Raeden Greer, Judd Lormand, Ashlynn Ross, Diva Tyler, Cristina Franco	
M A R C H	1	Phantom	RCR Media Group	Todd Robinson (director/screenplay); Ed Harris, David Duchovny, William Fichtner, Lance Henriksen, Johnathon Schaech, Julian Adams, Jason Beghe, Sean Patrick Flanery, Jason Gray-Stanford, Derek Magyar, Dagmara Domińczyk, Kip Pardue, Jordan Bridges	
M A R C H	1	Stoker	Fox Searchlight Pictures	Park Chan-wook (director); Wentworth Miller (screenplay); Mia Wasikowska, Matthew Goode, Nicole Kidman, Dermot Mulroney, Jacki Weaver, Lucas Till, Alden Ehrenreich, Phyllis Somerville, Ralph Brown, Judith Godrèche, Harmony Korine, David Alford	
M A R C H	8	Dead Man Down	FilmDistrict	Niels Arden Oplev (director); J. H. Wyman (screenplay); Colin Farrell, Noomi Rapace, Dominic Cooper, Terrence Howard, Isabelle Huppert, F. Murray Abraham, Armand Assante, Wade Barrett, Luis Da Silva, Franky G., James Biberi, Andrew Stewart-Jones, Jennifer Mudge, Giuseppe Bausilio, Raw Leiba, Hisham Tawfiq, Declan Mulvey, John Cenatiempo, Roy James Wilson Jr., Myles Humphus, Stephen Hill, Aaron Vexler, William Zielinski, Beata Furstenberg, Accalia Quintana, J. Santiago Suarez, Saul Stein, Roy Milton Davis, Rachel Resheff, Ante Novakovic, Kresh Novakovic	
M A R C H	8	Emperor	Lionsgate / Roadside Attractions	Peter Webber (director); Vera Blasi, David Klass (screenplay); Tommy Lee Jones, Matthew Fox, Eriko Hatsune, Toshiyuki Nishida, Masatoshi Nakamura, Kaori Momoi, Colin Moy, Masayoshi Haneda, Isao Natsuyagi, Masatō Ibu, Shōhei Hino, Takatarō Kataoka, Aaron Jackson, Nic Sampson, Will Wallace, Kelson Henderson, Stephen Papps, Shingo Usami, Ingrid Park, Yoko Narahashi, Paul Gittins, Stephen Hall	
M A R C H	8	Oz the Great and Powerful	Walt Disney Pictures / Roth Films	Sam Raimi (director); Mitchell Kapner, David Lindsay-Abaire (screenplay); James Franco, Mila Kunis, Michelle Williams, Zach Braff, Bill Cobbs, Joey King, Tony Cox, Stephen R. Hart, Bruce Campbell, Abigail Spencer, Tim Holmes, Ted Raimi, Dan Hicks, Ellen Sandweiss, Betsy Baker, Gene Jones, Martin Klebba, Shannon Murray, Robert Stromberg, Russell Bobbitt, T.J. Jagodowski, William Dick, Toni Wynne, Jim Moll, Jim Bird, Mia Serafino, Emma Raimi, Theresa Tilly, Dashiell Raimi, Oliver Raimi, John Paxton	
M A R C H	15	The Call	TriStar Pictures / WWE Studios / Troika Pictures	Brad Anderson (director); Richard D'Ovidio (screenplay); Halle Berry, Abigail Breslin, Morris Chestnut, Michael Eklund, Michael Imperioli, David Otunga, Justina Machado, José Zúñiga, Roma Maffia, Denise Dowse, Ella Rae Peck, Jenna Lamia, Tara Platt, Steven Williams, Thomas Rosales Jr., Kirk Baily, Eddie Frierson, Elisa Gabrielli, Nicholas Guest, Evie Thompson, Ross Gallo, Shawnee Badger	
M A R C H	15	The Incredible Burt Wonderstone	Warner Bros. Pictures / New Line Cinema	Don Scardino (director); John Francis Daley, Jonathan Goldstein (screenplay); Steve Carell, Steve Buscemi, Olivia Wilde, Alan Arkin, James Gandolfini, Jim Carrey, Jay Mohr, Michael Herbig, Zachary Gordon, Brad Garrett, Gillian Jacobs, David Copperfield, John Francis Daley, Mason Cook, Richard Wolffe, Erin Burnett, Fiona Hale, Sonya Eddy, Ron Ostrow, Melissa Ordway, Vance DeGeneres, Murray Gershenz, Forrest Wheeler, Chad Kultgen, Marceline Hugot, Jonathan Goldstein	
M A R C H	15	Spring Breakers	A24	Harmony Korine (director/screenplay); James Franco, Selena Gomez, Vanessa Hudgens, Ashley Benson, Rachel Korine, Gucci Mane, Heather Morris, Jeff Jarrett, Ash Lendzion, Emma Holzer, Russell Stuart	
M A R C H	22	Admission	Focus Features	Paul Weitz (director); Karen Croner (screenplay); Tina Fey, Paul Rudd, Michael Sheen, Wallace Shawn, Lily Tomlin, Nat Wolff, Gloria Reuben, Travaris Spears, Christopher Evan Welch, Sonya Walger, Leigha Hancock, Dan Levy, Sarita Choudhury, Rob Campbell, Olek Krupa, Brian d'Arcy James, Ann Harada, Nadia Alexander, Laura Jordan, Lisa Emery	
M A R C H	22	The Croods	20th Century Fox / DreamWorks Animation	Chris Sanders, Kirk DeMicco (directors/screenplay); Nicolas Cage, Emma Stone, Ryan Reynolds, Catherine Keener, Cloris Leachman, Clark Duke, Randy Thom, Chris Sanders	
M A R C H	22	Inappropriate Comedy	Freestyle Releasing	Vince Offer (director/screenplay); Ken Pringle, Ari Shaffir (screenplay); Ari Shaffir, Rob Schneider, Michelle Rodriguez, Adrien Brody, Lindsay Lohan, Da'Vone McDonald, Jessie Usher, Theo Von, Vince Offer, Dante, Noelle Kenney, Jonathan Spencer, Rick Chambers, Andrea Lwin, Calvin Sykes, Thai Edwards, Chalant Phifer, Ashton Jordaan Ruiz, Caroline Rich, Isaac Cheung, Jia Perlich, Christopher Kosek	
M A R C H	22	Love and Honor	IFC Films	Danny Mooney (director); Jim Burnstein, Garrett K. Schiff (screenplay); Liam Hemsworth, Austin Stowell, Teresa Palmer, Aimee Teegarden, Chris Lowell, Max Adler, Wyatt Russell, Delvon Roe, Chris Newman	
M A R C H	22	Olympus Has Fallen	FilmDistrict	Antoine Fuqua (director); Creighton Rothenburger, Katrin Benedikt (screenplay); Gerard Butler, Aaron Eckhart, Morgan Freeman, Angela Bassett, Robert Forster, Cole Hauser, Finley Jacobsen, Ashley Judd, Melissa Leo, Dylan McDermott, Radha Mitchell, Rick Yune, Sean O'Bryan, Lance Broadway, Tory Kittles, Keong Sim, Bill Stinchcomb, Hamish Macdonald, Lawrence O'Donnell, Phil Austin, James Ingersoll, Freddy Bosche, Kevin Moon, Malana Lea, Sam Medina	
M A R C H	24	Phil Spector	HBO Films	David Mamet (director/screenplay); Al Pacino, Helen Mirren, Jeffrey Tambor, Chiwetel Ejiofor, Rebecca Pidgeon, James Tolkan, David Aaron Baker, Matt Malloy, Jack Wallace, Dominic Hoffman, Jenn Lyon, Noah Mamet, Lauren Schacher, Clara Mamet, Natalia Nogulich, Tony Mamet, Martin Jarvis, Bob Jennings, Yolonda Ross, Alfredo Narciso, Stephen Tyrone Williams, George Aguilar, John Pirruccello, Philip Martin, Matthew Rauch, Linda Miller	
M A R C H	28	G.I. Joe: Retaliation	Paramount Pictures / Metro-Goldwyn-Mayer / Skydance Productions / Hasbro Studios / Di Bonaventura Pictures	Jon M. Chu (director); Rhett Reese, Paul Wernick (screenplay); D.J. Cotrona, Lee Byung-hun, Adrianne Palicki, Ray Park, Jonathan Pryce, Ray Stevenson, Channing Tatum, Bruce Willis, Dwayne Johnson, Arnold Vosloo, Elodie Yung, Luke Bracey, Robert Baker, Walton Goggins, Joseph Mazzello, RZA, Matt Gerald, Joe Chrest, James Carville, Ryan Hansen, DeRay Davis, Ilia Volok, Marcelo Tubert, James Lew, Ajay Mehta, Leo Howard, Dikran Tulaine, Jun Hee Lee, Afemo Omilami, Amin Joseph, Brandon Soo Hoo	
M A R C H	29	The Host	Open Road Films	Andrew Niccol (director/screenplay); Saoirse Ronan, Jake Abel, Max Irons, Frances Fisher, Chandler Canterbury, Diane Kruger, William Hurt, Boyd Holbrook, Scott Lawrence, Rachel Roberts, J.D. Evermore, Emily Browning, Bokeem Woodbine, Alex Roberts, Stephen Rider, Tatanka Means, Shawn Carter Peterson, Lee Hardee, Phil Austin, Raeden Greer, Mustafa Harris	
M A R C H	29	The Place Beyond the Pines	Focus Features / Sidney Kimmel Entertainment	Derek Cianfrance (director/screenplay); Ben Coccio, Darius Marder (screenplay); Ryan Gosling, Bradley Cooper, Eva Mendes, Ray Liotta, Ben Mendelsohn, Rose Byrne, Mahershala Ali, Bruce Greenwood, Harris Yulin, Dane DeHaan, Emory Cohen, Robert Clohessy, Gabe Fazio, Olga Merediz	
M A R C H	29	Temptation: Confessions of a Marriage Counselor	Lionsgate / Tyler Perry Studios	Tyler Perry (director/screenplay); Jurnee Smollett, Lance Gross, Kim Kardashian, Vanessa Williams, Robbie Jones, Renée Taylor, Brandy Norwood, Ella Joyce, Shamea Morton, Candice Coke, Zach Sale, Andrea Moore	
M A R C H	29	Wrong	Drafthouse Films	Quentin Dupieux (director/screenplay); Jack Plotnick, Éric Judor, Alexis Dziena, Steve Little, William Fichtner, Regan Burns, Mark Burnham, Arden Myrin, Maile Flanagan, Gary Valentine, Barry Alan Levine, LeShay N. Tomlinson, Charley Koontz, Nealla Gordon, Steven Ellison, Bob Jennings, Cole Jensen	

== April–June ==
Opening		Title	Production company	Cast and crew	Ref.
A P R I L	5	The Brass Teapot	Magnolia Pictures	Ramaa Mosley (director); Tim Macy (screenplay); Juno Temple, Michael Angarano, Alexis Bledel, Alia Shawkat, Bobby Moynihan, Ben Rappaport, Billy Magnussen, Steve Park, Lucy Walters, Jack McBrayer, Claudia Mason, Debra Monk, Thomas Middleditch, Cristin Milioti	
A P R I L	5	Evil Dead	TriStar Pictures / FilmDistrict / Ghost House Pictures	Fede Álvarez (director/screenplay); Rodo Sayagues (screenplay); Jane Levy, Shiloh Fernandez, Lou Taylor Pucci, Jessica Lucas, Elizabeth Blackmore, Rupert Degas, Bruce Campbell, Bob Dorian, Ellen Sandweiss, Jim McLarty, Randal Wilson	
A P R I L	5	Jurassic Park 3D	Universal Pictures	Steven Spielberg (director); Michael Crichton, David Koepp (screenplay); Sam Neill, Laura Dern, Jeff Goldblum, Richard Attenborough, Bob Peck, Martin Ferrero, BD Wong, Samuel L. Jackson, Wayne Knight, Joseph Mazzello, Ariana Richards, Miguel Sandoval, Jerry Molen, Cameron Thor, Christopher John Fields, Whitby Hertford, Dean Cundey, Greg Burson, Richard Kiley, Michael Lantieri	
A P R I L	5	Trance	Fox Searchlight Pictures / Pathé	Danny Boyle (director); Joe Ahearne, John Hodge (screenplay); James McAvoy, Vincent Cassel, Rosario Dawson, Danny Sapani, Tuppence Middleton, Simon Kunz, Michael Shaeffer, Matt Cross, Wahab Sheikh, Mark Poltimore	
A P R I L	5	Upstream Color	ERBP	Shane Carruth (director/screenplay); Amy Seimetz, Shane Carruth	
A P R I L	12	42	Warner Bros. Pictures / Legendary Pictures	Brian Helgeland (director/screenplay); Chadwick Boseman, Harrison Ford, Nicole Beharie, Christopher Meloni, André Holland, Lucas Black, Hamish Linklater, Ryan Merriman, Alan Tudyk, Brett Cullen, Brad Beyer, Gino Anthony Pesi, T.R. Knight, Max Gail, Toby Huss, James Pickens Jr., Mark Harelik, Derek Phillips, Jesse Luken, John C. McGinley, Matt Clark, Peter MacKenzie, C.J. Nitkowski, Peter Jurasik, Jeremy Ray Taylor, Colman Domingo, Rhoda Griffis, Danny Vinson, Dax Griffin, Jayson Warner Smith, Kelley Jakle, Jud Tylor, Bud Abbott, Lou Costello, Joe DiMaggio, Cullen Moss, Stan Musial, Charles Parnell, Henry G. Sanders, Tim Ware, Ted Williams, Dusan Brown, Linc Hand	
A P R I L	12	Disconnect	LD Entertainment	Henry-Alex Rubin (director); Andrew Stern (screenplay); Jason Bateman, Hope Davis, Frank Grillo, Michael Nyqvist, Paula Patton, Andrea Riseborough, Alexander Skarsgård, Max Thieriot, Colin Ford, Jonah Bobo, Daniella Rahme, Haley Ramm, Norbert Leo Butz, Kasi Lemmons, John Sharian, Marc Jacobs, Tessa Albertson, Erin Wilhelmi, Aviad Bernstein, Teresa Celentano, Cole Mohr, Kevin Csolak, Ella Lentini	
A P R I L	12	It's a Disaster	Oscilloscope Laboratories	Todd Berger (director/screenplay); Rachel Boston, Kevin M. Brennan, David Cross, America Ferrera, Jeff Grace, Erinn Hayes, Blaise Miller, Julia Stiles, Todd Berger, Jesse Draper	
A P R I L	12	Scary Movie 5	Dimension Films	Malcolm D. Lee (director/screenplay); Pat Proft, David Zucker (screenplay); Ashley Tisdale, Simon Rex, Erica Ash, Katrina Bowden, Terry Crews, Heather Locklear, J. P. Manoux, Mac Miller, Jerry O'Connell, Molly Shannon, Snoop Dogg, Kate Walsh, Katt Williams, Ava Kolker, Charlie Sheen, Lindsay Lohan, Jasmine Guy, Darrell Hammond, Sarah Hyland, Tyler Posey, Shad "Bow Wow" Moss, Mike Tyson, Usher, Lil Duval, Angie Stone, Audrina Patridge, Kendra Wilkinson, Big Ang, Shereé Whitfield, Clayton Landey, Josh Robert Thompson, David Zucker, Gracie Whitton, Lidia Porto, Ben Cornish, Lewis Thompson, Christopher Antonucci	
A P R I L	12	To the Wonder	Magnolia Pictures	Terrence Malick (director/screenplay); Ben Affleck, Olga Kurylenko, Rachel McAdams, Javier Bardem, Tatiana Chiline, Charles Baker, Romina Mondello, Marshall Bell, Darryl Cox	
A P R I L	18	Java Heat	IFC Films	Conor Allyn (director); Rob Allyn (screenplay); Kellan Lutz, Mickey Rourke, Ario Bayu, Atiqah Hasiholan, Rudy Wowor, Uli Auliani, Nick McKinless, Mike Muliadro, Mike Duncan, Rio Dewanto, Brent Duke	
A P R I L	19	Home Run	Samuel Goldwyn Films / Provident Films	David Boyd (director); Brian Brightly, Candace Lee, Eric Newman, Melanie Wistar (screenplay); Scott Elrod, Dorian Brown, Charles Henry Wyson, Vivica A. Fox, James Devoti, Nicole Leigh, Drew Waters, Robert Peters, Samantha Isler, Juan Martinez	
A P R I L	19	The Lords of Salem	Anchor Bay Films	Rob Zombie (director/screenplay); Sheri Moon Zombie, Bruce Davison, Jeff Daniel Phillips, Ken Foree, Patricia Quinn, Dee Wallace, María Conchita Alonso, Judy Geeson, Meg Foster, Andrew Prine, Richard Fancy, Camille Keaton, Bonita Friedericy, Nancy Linehan Charles, Barbara Crampton, Torsten Voges, Michael Berryman, Sid Haig, Ernest Lee Thomas, Lisa Marie, Clint Howard, Michael Shamus Wiles, Brandon Cruz, Daniel Roebuck, Udo Kier, Christopher Knight, John 5, Piggy D, Diana Hart, Richard Lynch, Maria Olsen	
A P R I L	19	Oblivion	Universal Pictures / Relativity Media	Joseph Kosinski (director); Karl Gajdusek, Michael Arndt (screenplay); Tom Cruise, Morgan Freeman, Olga Kurylenko, Andrea Riseborough, Nikolaj Coster-Waldau, Melissa Leo, Zoë Bell	
A P R I L	24	At Any Price	Sony Pictures Classics	Ramin Bahrani (director/screenplay); Hallie Elizabeth Newton (screenplay); Dennis Quaid, Zac Efron, Kim Dickens, Heather Graham, Clancy Brown, Chelcie Ross, Red West, Maika Monroe, John Hoogenakker, Ben Marten, Sophie Curtis	
A P R I L	26	Arthur Newman	Cinedigm Entertainment	Dante Ariola (director); Becky Johnston (screenplay); Colin Firth, Emily Blunt, Anne Heche, M. Emmet Walsh, David Andrews, Kristin Lehman, Lucas Hedges, Sterling Beaumon, Sol Miranda, Peter Jurasik, Nicole LaLiberte	
A P R I L	26	The Big Wedding	Lionsgate / Millennium Films	Justin Zackham (director/screenplay); Robert De Niro, Katherine Heigl, Diane Keaton, Amanda Seyfried, Topher Grace, Susan Sarandon, Robin Williams, Ben Barnes, Christine Ebersole, David Rasche, Patricia Rae, Ana Ayora, Kyle Bornheimer, Megan Ketch, Christa Campbell, Shana Dowdeswell, Sylvia Kauders, Edmund Lyndeck	
A P R I L	26	Mud	Lionsgate / Roadside Attractions	Jeff Nichols (director/screenplay); Matthew McConaughey, Tye Sheridan, Sam Shepard, Michael Shannon, Joe Don Baker, Ray McKinnon, Sarah Paulson, Paul Sparks, Jacob Lofland, Reese Witherspoon, Bonnie Sturdivant, Stuart Greer	
A P R I L	26	Pain & Gain	Paramount Pictures	Michael Bay (director); Christopher Markus, Stephen McFeely (screenplay); Mark Wahlberg, Dwayne Johnson, Anthony Mackie, Tony Shalhoub, Ed Harris, Rob Corddry, Rebel Wilson, Ken Jeong, Bar Paly, Michael Rispoli, Tony Plana, Emily Rutherfurd, Yolanthe Cabau, Larry Hankin, Peter Stormare, Brian Stepanek, Kurt Angle, Patrick Bristow, Wladimir Klitschko, Nikki Benz, A.J. LoCascio, Jimmy Star	
M A Y	3	Iron Man 3	Marvel Studios	Shane Black (director/screenplay); Drew Pearce (screenplay); Robert Downey Jr., Gwyneth Paltrow, Don Cheadle, Guy Pearce, Rebecca Hall, Stéphanie Szostak, James Badge Dale, William Sadler, Miguel Ferrer, Jon Favreau, Ben Kingsley, Paul Bettany, Ty Simpkins, Ashley Hamilton, Adam Pally, Shaun Toub, Stan Lee, Dale Dickey, Wang Xueqi, Jenna Ortega, Mark Ruffalo, Kendrick Cross, Spencer Garrett, Jan Broberg, Andy Lauer, Tom Virtue, Yvonne Zima, Cullen Moss, Rebecca Mader, Corey Hawkins, Linden Ashby, Sala Baker, Fernando Chien, Tara Macken, Bill Maher, Joan Rivers, George Kotsiopoulos, Josh Elliott, Megan Henderson, Pat Kiernan, Thomas Roberts, Daniel Agger, Chris Gethard, Joshua Harto, Noa Lindberg, Vince Offer, Jimmy Star, Michael Shamus Wiles, Bridger Zadina	
M A Y	3	Greetings from Tim Buckley	Focus World	Daniel Algrant (director/screenplay); Emma Sheanshang, David Brendel (Screenplay); Penn Badgley, Imogen Poots, William Sadler, Norbert Leo Butz, Kate Nash, Ben Rosenfield, Frank Wood, Isabelle McNally, Ilana Levine, Jadyn Douglas, Stephen Tyrone Williams, Frank Bello, Jennifer Turner	
M A Y	3	The Iceman	Millennium Entertainment	Ariel Vromen (director/screenplay); Morgan Land (screenplay), Michael Shannon, Winona Ryder, James Franco, Ray Liotta, Chris Evans, David Schwimmer, Stephen Dorff, Erin Cummings, Robert Davi, Weronika Rosati, John Ventimiglia, Christa Campbell, McKaley Miller, Danny A. Abeckaser, Ryan O'Nan, Nick Gomez, Eduardo Yanez, Vincent Fuentes, Ashlynn Ross	
M A Y	3	Kiss of the Damned	Magnolia Pictures	Alexandra Cassavetes (director/screenplay); Joséphine de La Baume, Milo Ventimiglia, Roxane Mesquida, Michael Rapaport, Riley Keough, Anna Mouglalis, Peter Vack, Tiarnie Coupland, Jay Brannan, Jonathan Caouette, Alexia Landeau, Ching Valdes-Aran, Olivia Lauletta	
M A Y	3	What Maisie Knew	Millennium Entertainment	Scott McGehee, David Siegel (directors); Carroll Cartwright, Nancy Doyne (screenplay); Julianne Moore, Alexander Skarsgård, Onata Aprile, Joanna Vanderham, Steve Coogan, Amelia Campbell, Maddie Corman, Paddy Croft, Trevor Long, Samantha Buck, Andrea Bordeaux, Stephen Mailer, James Colby, Sadie Rae, Jesse Stone Spadaccini, Diana García, Emma Holzer, Nadia Gan, Sean Gormley, Henry Kelemen, Valentine Aprile	
M A Y	10	Aftershock	Dimension Films	Nicolás López (director/screenplay); Eli Roth, Guillermo Amoedo (screenplay); Eli Roth, Andrea Osvárt, Ariel Levy, Natasha Yarovenko, Nicolas Martinez, Lorenza Izzo, Ignacia Allamand, Paz Bascuñán, Gabriela Hernández, Edgardo Bruna, Selena Gomez, Ramón Llao, Matías López, Álvaro López, Eduardo Domínguez	
M A Y	10	The Great Gatsby	Warner Bros. Pictures / Village Roadshow Pictures	Baz Luhrmann (director/screenplay); Craig Pearce (screenplay); Leonardo DiCaprio, Tobey Maguire, Carey Mulligan, Joel Edgerton, Isla Fisher, Jason Clarke, Amitabh Bachchan, Elizabeth Debicki, Jack Thompson, Adelaide Clemens, Richard Carter, Steve Bisley, Felix Williamson, Barry Otto, Vince Colosimo, Max Cullen, Brendan Maclean, Callan McAuliffe, Hamish Michael, Brian Rooney, Heather Mitchell, Kate Mulvany, Jake Ryan, Nick Tate, Gemma Ward, Arthur Dignam, Jacek Koman, Baz Luhrmann	
M A Y	10	He's Way More Famous Than You	Gravitas Ventures	Michael Urie (director); Halley Feiffer, Ryan Spahn (screenplay); Jesse Eisenberg, Halley Feiffer, Ben Stiller, Mamie Gummer, Vanessa Williams, Michael Urie, Natasha Lyonne, Ralph Macchio, Billy Morrissette, Ashlie Atkinson, Michael Ausiello, Daniel Breaker, Michael Chernus, Betty Gabriel, Salome Mulugeta, Tracee Chimo, Austin Pendleton, Daryl Roth, Carolyn Michelle Smith, Ryan Spahn	
M A Y	10	No One Lives	Anchor Bay Films	Ryuhei Kitamura (director); David Cohen (screenplay); Luke Evans, Adelaide Clemens, Lee Tergesen, Laura Ramsey, Derek Magyar, Beau Knapp, America Olivo, Tyrus, Lindsey Shaw, Gary Grubbs, Jake Austin Walker, Dalton E. Gray, Andrea Frankle, Rob Steinberg	
M A Y	10	Peeples	Lionsgate / 34th Street Films	Tina Gordon Chism (director/screenplay); Craig Robinson, Kerry Washington, David Alan Grier, S. Epatha Merkerson, Tyler James Williams, Melvin Van Peebles, Diahann Carroll, Kali Hawk, Malcolm Barrett, Ana Gasteyer, Kimrie Lewis-Davis, Jerome Preston Bates, Sylvia Kauders, Emilio Delgado	
M A Y	15	Star Trek Into Darkness	Paramount Pictures / Skydance Productions / Bad Robot	J. J. Abrams (director); Roberto Orci, Alex Kurtzman, Damon Lindelof (screenplay); John Cho, Benedict Cumberbatch, Alice Eve, Bruce Greenwood, Simon Pegg, Chris Pine, Zachary Quinto, Zoe Saldaña, Karl Urban, Peter Weller, Anton Yelchin, Leonard Nimoy, Noel Clarke, Nazneen Contractor, Amanda Foreman, Jay Scully, Jonathan Dixon, Aisha Hinds, Joseph Gatt, Sean Blakemore, Nick E. Tarabay, Beau Billingslea, Deep Roy, Jason Matthew Smith, Chris Hemsworth, Jennifer Morrison, Marco Sanchez, Lee Reherman, Scott Lawrence, Usman Ally, Nolan North, James Hiroyuki Liao, Rob Moran, Akiva Goldsman, Gianna Simone, Jacqueline King, Jeff Chase, Ser'Darius Blain, Heather Langenkamp, Cynthia Addai-Robinson, Eric Greitens, Brian T. Delaney, Arlen Escarpeta, David Acord, Kevin Michael Richardson, David Sobolov, Matthew Wood, Fred Tatasciore, Kiff VandenHeuvel, Julianne Buescher, Audrey Wasilewski, Bill Hader	
M A Y	17	Black Rock	LD Entertainment	Katie Aselton (director/screenplay); Mark Duplass (screenplay); Katie Aselton, Lake Bell, Kate Bosworth, Jay Paulson, Anslem Richardson, Will Bouvier, Carl K. Aselton III	
M A Y	17	The English Teacher	Artina Films	Craig Zisk (director/screenplay); Dan Chariton, Stacy Chariton (screenplay); Julianne Moore, Michael Angarano, Greg Kinnear, Lily Collins, Nathan Lane, Jessica Hecht, Norbert Leo Butz, Nikki Blonsky, Erin Wilhelmi, Alan Aisenberg, Charlie Saxton, Sophie Curtis, Fiona Shaw, John Hodgman, Remy Auberjonois, Jim Breuer, Alexander Flores, Peter Kim	
M A Y	17	Frances Ha	IFC Films	Noah Baumbach (director/screenplay); Greta Gerwig (screenplay); Greta Gerwig, Mickey Sumner, Adam Driver, Michael Zegen, Patrick Heusinger, Michael Esper, Charlotte d'Amboise, Grace Gummer, Josh Hamilton, Maya Kazan, Justine Lupe, Britta Phillips, Juliet Rylance, Dean Wareham, Isabelle McNally, Vanessa Ray, Marina Squerciati, Hannah Dunne, Peter Scanavino, Ryann Shane, Michelle Hurst	
M A Y	17	The Reluctant Fundamentalist	Mirabai Films	Mira Nair (director); William Wheeler (screenplay); Riz Ahmed, Kate Hudson, Liev Schreiber, Kiefer Sutherland, Om Puri, Shabana Azmi, Haluk Bilginer, Meesha Shafi, Martin Donovan, Adil Hussain, Imaad Shah, Chandrachur Singh, Nelsan Ellis, Christopher Nicholas Smith, Victor Slezak, Clayton Landey, Sonya Jehan, Mahmood Mamdani, James Sutton, Ashwath Bhatt, Roy McCrerey, Gary Richardson	
M A Y	23	The Hangover Part III	Warner Bros. Pictures / Legendary Pictures / Green Hat Films	Todd Phillips (director/screenplay); Craig Mazin (screenplay); Bradley Cooper, Ed Helms, Zach Galifianakis, Ken Jeong, Heather Graham, Jeffrey Tambor, Justin Bartha, John Goodman, Mike Epps, Sasha Barrese, Jamie Chung, Sondra Currie, Gillian Vigman, Melissa McCarthy, Oliver Cooper, Mike Vallely, Oscar Torre, Jonny Coyne, Betty Murphy, Lela Loren, Todd Phillips, Damion Poitier, Lewis Tan	
M A Y	24	Before Midnight	Sony Pictures Classics	Richard Linklater (director/screenplay); Ethan Hawke, Julie Delpy (screenplay); Ethan Hawke, Julie Delpy, Seamus Davey-Fitzpatrick, Xenia Kalogeropoulou, Walter Lassally, Ariane Labed, Athina Rachel Tsangari, John Sloss, Jennifer Prior, Charlotte Prior, Yiannis Papadopoulos, Panos Koronis	
M A Y	24	Epic	20th Century Fox / Blue Sky Studios	Chris Wedge (director); James V. Hart, William Joyce, Daniel Shere, Tom J. Astle, Matt Ember (screenplay); Colin Farrell, Josh Hutcherson, Amanda Seyfried, Christoph Waltz, Aziz Ansari, Chris O'Dowd, Pitbull, Jason Sudeikis, Steven Tyler, Beyoncé Knowles, Blake Anderson, Judah Friedlander, Tom Wilson, John DiMaggio, Rosa Salazar, Kyle Kinane, Emma Kenney, Jim Conroy, Troy Evans, Helen Hong, Malikha Mallette, Edie Mirman, Matt Adler, Moosie Drier, Bridget Hoffman, Rif Hutton, Selenis Leyva, Eric Nelsen, Chris Phillips, Michelle Ruff, Christopher Scarabosio, Byron Thames, Randy Thom, Jeff Bennett, Jason Harris Katz	
M A Y	24	Fast & Furious 6	Universal Pictures / Relativity Media / Original Film	Justin Lin (director); Chris Morgan (screenplay); Vin Diesel, Paul Walker, Dwayne Johnson, Michelle Rodriguez, Jordana Brewster, Tyrese Gibson, Chris "Ludacris" Bridges, Sung Kang, Luke Evans, Gina Carano, John Ortiz, Gal Gadot, Elsa Pataky, Shea Whigham, Laz Alonso, Clara Paget, Kim Kold, Joe Taslim, David Ajala, Thure Lindhardt, Benjamin Davies, Stephen Marcus, Rita Ora, Jason Statham, Andrew Koji, Jimmy Star, Julian Stone, Johnny Strong, Samuel Stewart	
M A Y	26	Behind the Candelabra	HBO Films	Steven Soderbergh (director); Richard LaGravenese (screenplay); Michael Douglas, Matt Damon, Dan Aykroyd, Scott Bakula, Rob Lowe, Debbie Reynolds, Boyd Holbrook, Tom Papa, Nicky Katt, Cheyenne Jackson, Paul Reiser, David Koechner, Mike O'Malley, Eddie Jemison, Jane Morris, Garrett M. Brown, Bruce Ramsay, Deborah Lacey, Austin Stowell, Anthony Crivello, Kiff VandenHeuvel, Charlotte Crossley, Josh Meyers, Johnny Carson, Fielding Edlow, Amber Lee Ettinger, Lenny Jacobson, Peggy King, Thure Riefenstein, Eric Zuckerman, Pat Asanti, Casey Kramer	
M A Y	31	After Earth	Columbia Pictures / Overbrook Entertainment / Blinding Edge Pictures	M. Night Shyamalan (director/screenplay); Gary Whitta (screenplay); Jaden Smith, Will Smith, Sophie Okonedo, Zoë Kravitz, Glenn Morshower, Kristofer Hivju, Sacha Dhawan, Chris Geere, Diego Klattenhoff, David Denman, Lincoln Lewis, Isabelle Fuhrman, Sincere L. Bobb, Jaden Martin, Shiva Prabhukumar	
M A Y	31	Byzantium	StudioCanal	Neil Jordan (director); Moira Buffini (screenplay); Saoirse Ronan, Gemma Arterton, Sam Riley, Jonny Lee Miller, Daniel Mays, Caleb Landry Jones, Tom Hollander, Maria Doyle Kennedy, Warren Brown, Thure Lindhardt, Uri Gavriel, Kate Ashfield, Barry Cassin, Christine Marzano	
M A Y	31	The East	Fox Searchlight Pictures	Zal Batmanglij (director/screenplay); Brit Marling (screenplay); Brit Marling, Alexander Skarsgård, Ellen Page, Patricia Clarkson, Toby Kebbell, Shiloh Fernandez, Julia Ormond, Jason Ritter, Danielle Macdonald, Billy Slaughter, Wilbur Fitzgerald, Aldis Hodge, Billy Magnussen, Jamey Sheridan, Patricia French	
M A Y	31	The Kings of Summer	CBS Films	Jordan Vogt-Roberts (director); Chris Galletta (screenplay); Nick Robinson, Gabriel Basso, Moisés Arias, Mary Lynn Rajskub, Erin Moriarty, Marc Evan Jackson, Megan Mullally, Alison Brie, Nick Offerman, Eugene Cordero, Gillian Vigman, Thomas Middleditch, Nathan Keyes, Angela Trimbur, Kumail Nanjiani, Austin Abrams, Craig Cackowski, Lili Reinhart, Hannibal Buress, Tony Hale, Brian Sacca	
M A Y	31	Now You See Me	Summit Entertainment	Louis Leterrier (director); Ed Solomon, Boaz Yakin, Edward Ricourt (screenplay); Jesse Eisenberg, Mark Ruffalo, Woody Harrelson, Mélanie Laurent, Isla Fisher, Common, Dave Franco, Michael Caine, Morgan Freeman, Jessica C. Lindsey, David Warshofsky, Michael Kelly, José Garcia, Caitriona Balfe, Stephanie Honoré, Laura Cayouette, J. LaRose, Justine Wachsberger, Conan O'Brien, Brad Abrell, Joe Chrest, Griff Furst, Chris Browning, Christopher Matthew Cook, Elias Koteas	
J U N E	7	Hello Herman	Freestyle Releasing	Michelle Danner (director); John Buffalo Mailer (screenplay); Norman Reedus, Martha Higareda, Rob Estes, Christine Dunford, Michelle Danner, Lindsay Bushman, Garrett Backstrom, Andy McPhee, Olivia Faye, Jake White, Matt Beck, John Bobek, Juliana Penner, Nita Whitaker Lafontaine, Alex Neuberger, Arielle Sitrick, Nick Meyers, Lisa Papatzimas, Alan Pietruszewski, Dominic Bogart	
J U N E	7	The Internship	20th Century Fox / Regency Enterprises / 21 Laps Entertainment	Shawn Levy (director); Vince Vaughn, Jared Stern (screenplay); Vince Vaughn, Owen Wilson, Rose Byrne, Max Minghella, Aasif Mandvi, Josh Brener, Dylan O'Brien, Tobit Raphael, Tiya Sircar, Jessica Szohr, Josh Gad, Eric André, Harvey Guillén, Gary Anthony Williams, Bruno Amato, B.J. Novak, Rob Riggle, JoAnna Garcia Swisher, Brian F. Durkin, Valyn Hall, John Goodman, Will Ferrell, Sergey Brin, Shawn Levy	
J U N E	7	Much Ado About Nothing	Lionsgate / Roadside Attractions	Joss Whedon (director/screenplay); Amy Acker, Alexis Denisof, Reed Diamond, Nathan Fillion, Clark Gregg, Fran Kranz, Sean Maher, Jillian Morgese, Spencer Treat Clark, Riki Lindhome, Ashley Johnson, Tom Lenk, Nick Kocher, Brian McElhaney, Romy Rosemont, Drew Goddard, Maurissa Tancharoen, Jed Whedon, Zack Whedon, Emma Bates, Joshua Zar, Paul M. Meston	
J U N E	7	The Purge	Universal Pictures / Blumhouse Productions / Platinum Dunes	James DeMonaco (director/screenplay); Ethan Hawke, Lena Headey, Adelaide Kane, Max Burkholder, Arija Bareikis, Chris Mulkey, Rhys Wakefield, Chester Lockhart, Edwin Hodge, Tony Oller, Karen Strassman, Cindy Robinson, Tom Yi, Tisha French, Dana Bunch, Peter Bzovdas	
J U N E	7	Tiger Eyes	Freestyle Releasing	Lawrence Blume (director/screenplay); Judy Blume (screenplay); Willa Holland, Amy Jo Johnson, Cynthia Stevenson, Tatanka Means, Elise Eberle, Russell Means, Lucien Dale, Forrest Fyre, Michael Sheets, Josh Berry, Teo Olivares, Barbie Robertson, Frank Bond, Marya Beauvais, Judy Blume	
J U N E	7	Violet & Daisy	GreeneStreet Films / Magic Violet	Geoffrey S. Fletcher (director/screenplay); Saoirse Ronan, Alexis Bledel, James Gandolfini, Danny Trejo, Marianne Jean-Baptiste, Lynda Gravátt, Tatiana Maslany, Cody Horn, John Ventimiglia, Danny Hoch	
J U N E	12	This Is the End	Columbia Pictures / Mandate Pictures / Point Grey Pictures	Seth Rogen, Evan Goldberg (directors/screenplay); James Franco, Jonah Hill, Seth Rogen, Jay Baruchel, Danny McBride, Craig Robinson, Michael Cera, Emma Watson, Mindy Kaling, David Krumholtz, Christopher Mintz-Plasse, Rihanna, Martin Starr, Paul Rudd, Channing Tatum, Kevin Hart, Aziz Ansari, Backstreet Boys, Evan Goldberg, Jason Segel, Brian Huskey, Jason Trost, Carol Sutton, Chi Muoi Lo, Jason Stone	
J U N E	14	The Bling Ring	A24	Sofia Coppola (director/screenplay); Emma Watson, Israel Broussard, Katie Chang, Taissa Farmiga, Claire Julien, Georgia Rock, Leslie Mann, Carlos Miranda, Gavin Rossdale, Annie Fitzgerald, Stacy Edwards, G. Mac Brown, Marc Coppola, Janet Song, Doug DeBeech, Erin Daniels, Halston Sage, Patricia Lentz, Maika Monroe, Logan Miller, Paris Hilton, Kirsten Dunst, Brett Goodkin	
J U N E	14	Hatchet III	Dark Sky Films / ArieScope Pictures	B. J. McDonnell (director); Adam Green (screenplay); Danielle Harris, Caroline Williams, Zach Galligan, Derek Mears, Rileah Vanderbilt, Parry Shen, Kane Hodder, Robert Diago DoQui, Cody Blue Snider, Sean Whalen, Diane Ayala Goldner, Jason Trost, Sid Haig, John Michael Sudolt, Joel David Moore, Sarah Elbert, Adam Green, Jared DePasquale, Ted Geoghegan	
J U N E	14	Man of Steel	Warner Bros. Pictures / Legendary Pictures / DC Entertainment / Syncopy Peters Entertainment	Zack Snyder (director); David S. Goyer (screenplay); Henry Cavill, Amy Adams, Michael Shannon, Kevin Costner, Diane Lane, Laurence Fishburne, Antje Traue, Ayelet Zurer, Christopher Meloni, Russell Crowe, Harry Lennix, Richard Schiff, Carla Gugino, Mackenzie Gray, Michael Kelly, Julian Richings, Samantha Jo, David Lewis, Tahmoh Penikett, David Paetkau, Alessandro Juliani, Mike Dopud, Ian Tracey, Tom Nagel, Allison Crowe, Christina Wren, Rebecca Buller, Jadin Gould, Rowen Kahn, Jack Foley, Joseph Cranford, Richard Cetrone, Revard Dufresne, Apollonia Vanova	
J U N E	16	My Little Pony: Equestria Girls	Hasbro Studios	Jayson Thiessen (director); Meghan McCarthy (screenplay); Tara Strong, Ashleigh Ball, Andrea Libman, Tabitha St. Germain, Cathy Weseluck, Rebecca Shoichet, Lee Tockar, Richard Ian Cox, Nicole Oliver, Vincent Tong, Britt McKillip, Shannon Chan-Kent, Kazumi Evans	
J U N E	21	Monsters University	Walt Disney Pictures / Pixar Animation Studios	Dan Scanlon (director/screenplay); Daniel Gerson, Robert L. Baird (screenplay); Billy Crystal, John Goodman, Steve Buscemi, Helen Mirren, Peter Sohn, Joel Murray, Sean Hayes, Dave Foley, Charlie Day, Nathan Fillion, Alfred Molina, Tyler Labine, Aubrey Plaza, Bobby Moynihan, Julia Sweeney, Bonnie Hunt, John Krasinski, Bill Hader, Beth Behrs, Noah Johnston, Bob Peterson, John Ratzenberger, John Cygan, Jess Harnell, Lori Alan, Mona Marshall, Dan Scanlon, Marcia Wallace, Donovan Patton, Gregg Berger, Rodger Bumpass, Colleen O'Shaughnessey, Carlos Alazraqui, Jack Angel, Bob Bergen, Paul Eiding, Bill Farmer, Don Fullilove, Teresa Ganzel, Daniel Gerson, John Kassir, Elissa Knight, Dawnn Lewis, Sherry Lynn, Danny Mann, Jason Marsden, Mickie McGowan, Alec Medlock, Matthew Mercer, Laraine Newman, Dannah Phirman, Jeff Pidgeon, Cristina Pucelli, Jan Rabson, Patrick Seitz, Mindy Sterling, Tara Strong, Jim Ward, April Winchell, Ava Acres, Isabella Acres, Mason Cook, Jack Bright, Raymond Ochoa	
J U N E	21	World War Z	Paramount Pictures / Plan B Entertainment / Skydance Productions / Hemisphere Media Capital / GK Films	Marc Forster (director); Matthew Michael Carnahan, Drew Goddard, Damon Lindelof (screenplay); Brad Pitt, Mireille Enos, Daniella Kertesz, James Badge Dale, David Morse, Fana Mokoena, David Andrews, Sterling Jerins, Abigail Hargrove, Peter Capaldi, Pierfrancesco Favino, Ruth Negga, Moritz Bleibtreu, Ludi Boeken, Grégory Fitoussi, Elyes Gabel, Matthew Fox	
J U N E	26	How to Make Money Selling Drugs	Tribeca Film	Matthew Cooke (director/screenplay); Radley Balko, Cheye Calvo, Barry Cooper, Judge James P. Gray, Woody Harrelson, Arianna Huffington, 50 Cent, Gil Kerlikowske, Eminem, Brian O'Dea, "Freeway" Rick Ross, Susan Sarandon, Russell Simmons, David Simon, Skipp Townsend, Bobby Carlton, Keith Kruskall, Neill Franklin, Joe Gilbride, John E. Harriel Jr., Raymond Madden, Yolanda Madden, Alexandra Natapoff, Patrick Reynalds, Eric Sterling, Howard Woolridge, Mr. X, Pepe	
J U N E	28	Copperhead	The Film Collective	Ronald F. Maxwell (director); Bill Kauffman (screenplay); Billy Campbell, Angus Macfadyen, Augustus Prew, Lucy Boynton, Casey Thomas Brown, Peter Fonda, Key Williams, François Arnaud, Josh Cruddas, Genevieve Steele, Ryan Doucette	
J U N E	28	The Heat	20th Century Fox / Chernin Entertainment	Paul Feig (director); Katie Dippold (screenplay); Sandra Bullock, Melissa McCarthy, Demián Bichir, Marlon Wayans, Michael Rapaport, Dan Bakkedahl, Taran Killam, Michael McDonald, Spoken Reasons, Jane Curtin, Michael Tucci, Joey McIntyre, Bill Burr, Nate Corddry, Jessica Chaffin, Jamie Denbo, Tom Wilson, Adam Ray, Kaitlin Olson, Tony Hale, Andy Buckley, Ben Falcone, John Ross Bowie, Chris Gethard, Steve Bannos, Zach Woods, Katie Dippold, Mitch Silpa, Paul Feig	
J U N E	28	Hummingbird	Lionsgate / Roadside Attractions	Steven Knight (director/screenplay); Jason Statham, Agata Buzek, Christian Brassington, Vicky McClure, Benedict Wong, Ger Ryan, Youssef Kerkour, Danny Webb, Dai Bradley, Siobhan Hewlett, Victoria Bewick, Sang Lui, Lillie Buttery, Bruce Wang, Steven Beard	
J U N E	28	Some Girl(s)	Leeden Media	Daisy von Scherler Mayer (director); Neil LaBute (screenplay); Adam Brody, Kristen Bell, Zoe Kazan, Mía Maestro, Jennifer Morrison, Emily Watson	
J U N E	28	White House Down	Columbia Pictures / Centropolis Entertainment	Roland Emmerich (director); James Vanderbilt (screenplay); Channing Tatum, Jamie Foxx, Maggie Gyllenhaal, Jason Clarke, Richard Jenkins, James Woods, Joey King, Nicolas Wright, Jimmi Simpson, Michael Murphy, Rachelle Lefevre, Lance Reddick, Matt Craven, Jake Weber, Peter Jacobson, Garcelle Beauvais, Kevin Rankin, Barbara Williams, Falk Hentschel, Romano Orzari, Jackie Geary, Andrew Simms, Vincent Leclerc, Anthony Lemke, Patrick Sabongui, Rhys Williams, Kwasi Songui, Leni Parker, Chad Connell, Lauren Sánchez, Brooke Anderson, Ben Mankiewicz	

== July–September ==
Opening		Title	Production company	Cast and crew	Ref.
J U L Y	3	Despicable Me 2	Universal Pictures / Illumination Entertainment	Chris Renaud, Pierre Coffin (directors); Cinco Paul, Ken Daurio (screenplay); Steve Carell, Kristen Wiig, Miranda Cosgrove, Dana Gaier, Elsie Fisher, Russell Brand, Pierre Coffin, Benjamin Bratt, Steve Coogan, Ken Jeong, Kristen Schaal, Moisés Arias, Chris Renaud, Vanessa Bayer, Nickolai Stoilov, Nasim Pedrad, Ava Acres, Lori Alan, Jack Angel, Eva Bella, John Cygan, Debi Derryberry, Jess Harnell, Danny Mann, Mona Marshall, Mickie McGowan, Alec Medlock, Laraine Newman, Jan Rabson, Katie Silverman, Casey Simpson, James Kevin Ward, April Winchell	
J U L Y	3	Kevin Hart: Let Me Explain	Summit Entertainment	Leslie Small (director); Kevin Hart	
J U L Y	3	The Lone Ranger	Walt Disney Pictures / Jerry Bruckheimer Films	Gore Verbinski (director); Ted Elliott, Terry Rossio, Eric Aronson, Justin Haythe (screenplay); Armie Hammer, Johnny Depp, Ruth Wilson, William Fichtner, Helena Bonham Carter, James Badge Dale, Barry Pepper, Tom Wilkinson, James Frain, Mason Cook, Saginaw Grant, Harry Treadaway, Lew Temple, Leon Rippy, Stephen Root, Damon Herriman, Joaquín Cosio, JD Cullum, Matt O'Leary, W. Earl Brown, Timothy V. Murphy, Gil Birmingham, Robert Baker, Randy Oglesby, Brad Greenquist, Rance Howard, Leonard Earl Howze, Freda Foh Shen, Margaret Bowman	
J U L Y	5	Stuck in Love	Millennium Entertainment	Josh Boone (director/screenplay); Greg Kinnear, Jennifer Connelly, Lily Collins, Logan Lerman, Nat Wolff, Liana Liberato, Stephen King, Kristen Bell, Spencer Breslin, Patrick Schwarzenegger, Rusty Joiner	
J U L Y	5	The Way Way Back	Fox Searchlight Pictures / OddLot Entertainment	Nat Faxon, Jim Rash (directors/screenplay); Steve Carell, Toni Collette, Allison Janney, AnnaSophia Robb, Sam Rockwell, Maya Rudolph, Liam James, Amanda Peet, Rob Corddry, Jim Rash, Nat Faxon, Robert Capron, River Alexander, Ava Deluca-Verley, Zoe Levin, Adam Riegler, Jake Picking	
J U L Y	12	Dealin' with Idiots	IFC Films	Jeff Garlin (director/screenplay); Jeff Garlin, Christopher Guest, Fred Willard, Bob Odenkirk, J. B. Smoove, Gina Gershon, Kerri Kenney-Silver, Jami Gertz, Timothy Olyphant, Richard Kind, Steve Agee, Jim Sheridan, Nia Vardalos, Dave Sheridan, Hope Dworaczyk, Ian Gomez, Ali Wong, Xolo Maridueña, Chris Williams, Deanna Brooks, Natasha Leggero, Ian Roberts, Luenell, Bobby Dekeyser, Hiromi Oshima, Freddy Lockhart, Sarayu Rao	
J U L Y	12	Fruitvale Station	The Weinstein Company	Ryan Coogler (director/screenplay); Michael B. Jordan, Octavia Spencer, Melonie Diaz, Ahna O'Reilly, Kevin Durand, Chad Michael Murray, Christina Elmore	
J U L Y	12	Grown Ups 2	Columbia Pictures / Happy Madison Productions	Dennis Dugan (director); Fred Wolf (screenplay); Adam Sandler, Kevin James, Chris Rock, David Spade, Taylor Lautner, David Henrie, Patrick Schwarzenegger, Nick Swardson, Cheri Oteri, Salma Hayek, Steve Buscemi, Milo Ventimiglia, Maria Bello, Aly Michalka, Maya Rudolph, Alexander Ludwig, Andy Samberg, Steve Austin, Will Forte, Taran Killam, Jon Lovitz, Akiva Schaffer, Jorma Taccone, Tim Meadows, Shaquille O'Neal, Colin Quinn, Bobby Moynihan, Paul Brittain, Georgia Engel, Peter Dante, Oliver Hudson, Allen Covert, Jake Goldberg, Cameron Boyce, Alexys Nycole Sanchez, Ada-Nicole Sanger, Nadji Jeter, China Anne McClain, Ellen Cleghorne, April Rose, Dan Patrick, Halston Sage, Norm Crosby, Dennis Dugan, Jonathan Loughran, Sadie Sandler, Sunny Sandler, Chris Berman, Aly Michalka, Jared Sandler, Jimmy Tatro, Erin Heatherton, The J. Geils Band, Duke Levine, Tom Arey	
J U L Y	12	Killing Season	Millennium Entertainment	Mark Steven Johnson (director); Evan Daugherty (screenplay); Robert De Niro, John Travolta, Milo Ventimiglia, Elizabeth Olin	
J U L Y	12	Pacific Rim	Warner Bros. Pictures / Legendary Pictures	Guillermo del Toro (director/screenplay); Travis Beacham (screenplay); Charlie Hunnam, Idris Elba, Rinko Kikuchi, Charlie Day, Robert Kazinsky, Max Martini, Ron Perlman, Clifton Collins Jr., Diego Klattenhoff, Robert Maillet, Burn Gorman, Heather Doerksen, Joe Pingue, Santiago Segura, Brad William Henke, Larry Joe Campbell, Robin Thomas, David Richmond-Peck, Sebastian Pigott, David Fox, Thomas Tull, Ellen McLain	
J U L Y	12	V/H/S/2	Magnolia Pictures	Adam Wingard, Eduardo Sánchez, Gareth Evans, Gregg Hale (directors/screenplay); Kelsy Abbott, Fachri Albar, Oka Antara, Devon Brookshire, Bette Cassatt, L.C. Holt, Hannah Hughes, Kevin Hunt, Lawrence Michael Levine, Mindy Robinson	
J U L Y	17	Turbo	20th Century Fox / DreamWorks Animation	David Soren (director/screenplay); Robert Siegel, Darren Lemke (screenplay); Ryan Reynolds, Paul Giamatti, Michael Peña, Luis Guzmán, Bill Hader, Richard Jenkins, Ken Jeong, Michelle Rodriguez, Maya Rudolph, Ben Schwartz, Kurtwood Smith, Snoop Dogg, Samuel L. Jackson, Dario Franchitti, Will Power, Mario Andretti, Paul Page, Chris Parnell, Paul Dooley, Chris Miller, Lloyd Sherr, Derek Drymon, Mark Walton, Michael Patrick Bell	
J U L Y	19	The Conjuring	Warner Bros. Pictures / New Line Cinema	James Wan (director); Chad Hayes, Carey Hayes (screenplay); Patrick Wilson, Vera Farmiga, Ron Livingston, Lili Taylor, Shannon Kook, Mackenzie Foy, Joey King, Shanley Caswell, Hayley McFarland, Steve Coulter, John Brotherton, Kyla Deaver, Sterling Jerins, Amy Tipton, Joseph Bishara, Lorraine Warren, Marion Guyot, Morganna May, Zach Pappas, Christof Veillon	
J U L Y	19	Girl Most Likely	Lionsgate / Roadside Attractions	Robert Pulcini, Shari Springer Berman (directors); Michelle Morgan (screenplay); Kristen Wiig, Annette Bening, Matt Dillon, Christopher Fitzgerald, Darren Criss, Julia Stiles, Natasha Lyonne, June Diane Raphael, Michelle Hurd, Nate Corddry, Mickey Sumner, Ronald Guttman, Murray Bartlett, Bob Balaban, Andrea Martin, Sydney Lucas, Brian Petsos, Nicole Patrick, Reed Birney	
J U L Y	19	R.I.P.D.	Universal Pictures / Original Film	Robert Schwentke (director); Matt Manfredi, Phil Hay (screenplay); Ryan Reynolds, Jeff Bridges, Kevin Bacon, Stéphanie Szostak, Mary-Louise Parker, Marisa Miller, Mike O'Malley, James Hong, Robert Knepper, Devin Ratray, Larry Joe Campbell, Piper Mackenzie Harris, Michael Tow, Matt McColm, Tobias Segal, Toby Huss, Mike Judge, Jon Olson	
J U L Y	19	Red 2	Summit Entertainment / DC Comics	Dean Parisot (director); Erich Hoeber, Jon Hoeber (screenplay); Bruce Willis, John Malkovich, Helen Mirren, Mary-Louise Parker, Catherine Zeta-Jones, Byung-hun Lee, Karl Urban, Neal McDonough, Anthony Hopkins, David Thewlis, Brian Cox, Garrick Hagon, Tim Pigott-Smith, Philip Arditti, Emma Heming Willis, Steven Berkoff, Titus Welliver, Jong Kun Lee, Mitchell Mullen, Martin Sims, Tristan D. Lalla	
J U L Y	26	Blue Jasmine	Sony Pictures Classics	Woody Allen (director/screenplay); Alec Baldwin, Cate Blanchett, Bobby Cannavale, Louis C.K., Andrew Dice Clay, Sally Hawkins, Peter Sarsgaard, Michael Stuhlbarg, Alden Ehrenreich, Tammy Blanchard, Max Casella, Glenn Fleshler, Charlie Tahan, Brynn Thayer, Emily Bergl, Barbara Garrick, Ali Fedotowsky	
J U L Y	26	The To Do List	CBS Films	Maggie Carey (director/screenplay); Aubrey Plaza, Rachel Bilson, Bill Hader, Andy Samberg, Scott Porter, Connie Britton, Clark Gregg, Christopher Mintz-Plasse, Donald Glover, Johnny Simmons, Sarah Steele, Alia Shawkat, Nolan Gould, Adam Pally, Jack McBrayer, Brian Huskey, Liz Cackowski, Lauren Lapkus	
J U L Y	26	The Wolverine	20th Century Fox / Marvel Entertainment	James Mangold (director); Christopher McQuarrie, Mark Bomback (screenplay); Hugh Jackman, Famke Janssen, Hiroyuki Sanada, Hal Yamanouchi, Tao Okamoto, Rila Fukushima, Will Yun Lee, Svetlana Khodchenkova, Brian Tee, Ken Yamamura, Lynn Collins, Patrick Stewart, Ian McKellen	
J U L Y	31	The Smurfs 2	Columbia Pictures / Sony Pictures Animation / The Kerner Entertainment Company	Raja Gosnell (director); J. David Stern, David N. Weiss, Karey Kirkpatrick, Jay Sherick, David Ronn (screenplay); Neil Patrick Harris, Jayma Mays, Hank Azaria, Tim Gunn, Brendan Gleeson, Katy Perry, Jonathan Winters, Alan Cumming, Fred Armisen, George Lopez, Anton Yelchin, John Oliver, Christina Ricci, J.B. Smoove, Christopher Mintz-Plasse, Frank Welker, Jacob Tremblay, Nancy O'Dell, Mario Lopez, Jimmy Kimmel, Tom Kane, Paul Reubens, B. J. Novak, Shaquille O'Neal, Shaun White, Jeff Foxworthy, Gary Basaraba, Adam Wylie, Kenan Thompson, John Kassir, Joel McCrary, Kevin Lee, Patrick Sabongui	
A U G U S T	2	2 Guns	Universal Pictures	Baltasar Kormákur (director); Blake Masters (screenplay); Mark Wahlberg, Denzel Washington, Paula Patton, Bill Paxton, Edward James Olmos, James Marsden, Fred Ward, Robert John Burke, Patrick Fischler, Allie DeBerry, Christopher Matthew Cook, Azure Parsons, John McConnell, Ambyr Childers, Lucy Faust, Bill Stinchcomb, Lindsey Gort, Edgar Arreola	
A U G U S T	2	The Canyons	IFC Films	Paul Schrader (director); Bret Easton Ellis (screenplay); Lindsay Lohan, James Deen, Nolan Funk, Amanda Brooks, Gus Van Sant, Chris Zeischegg, Lauren Schacher, Jim Boeven, Tenille Houston, Victor of Aquitaine, Philip Pavel	
A U G U S T	2	Europa Report	Wayfare Entertainment	Sebastián Cordero (director); Philip Gelatt (screenplay); Sharlto Copley, Michael Nyqvist, Daniel Wu, Anamaria Marinca, Christian Camargo, Karolina Wydra, Embeth Davidtz, Dan Fogler	
A U G U S T	2	The Spectacular Now	A24	James Ponsoldt (director); Scott Neustadter, Michael Weber (screenplay); Miles Teller, Shailene Woodley, Kaitlyn Dever, Brie Larson, Dayo Okeniyi, Kyle Chandler, Bob Odenkirk, Andre Royo, Mary Elizabeth Winstead, Jennifer Jason Leigh, E. Roger Mitchell, Gary Weeks, Masam Holden, Whitney Goin, Nicci Faires	
A U G U S T	7	Percy Jackson: Sea of Monsters	20th Century Fox / Fox 2000 Pictures	Thor Freudenthal (director); Scott Alexander, Larry Karaszewski (screenplay); Logan Lerman, Alexandra Daddario, Douglas Smith, Mary Birdsong, Yvette Nicole Brown, Missi Pyle, Nathan Fillion, Anthony Stewart Head, Paloma Kwiatkowski, Leven Rambin, Stanley Tucci, Robert Maillet, Brandon T. Jackson, Jake Abel, Grey Damon, Octavia Spencer, Craig Robinson, Robert Knepper, Ron Perlman, Shohreh Aghdashloo, Derek Mears, Aleks Paunovic, Alisha Newton, Hunter Platin, Jordan Weller	
A U G U S T	7	We're the Millers	Warner Bros. Pictures / New Line Cinema	Rawson Marshall Thurber (director); Sean Anders, Steve Faber, Bob Fisher, Dan Fybel, John Morris, Rick Rinaldi (screenplay); Jennifer Aniston, Jason Sudeikis, Emma Roberts, Ed Helms, Thomas Lennon, Nick Offerman, Kathryn Hahn, Will Poulter, Molly Quinn, Tomer Sisley, Matthew Willig, Luis Guzmán, Mark L. Young, Ken Marino, Laura-Leigh, Scott Adsit, Sam Richardson, Kevin Dorff, Brendan Hunt, Vickie Eng, Rawson Marshall Thurber	
A U G U S T	9	Elysium	TriStar Pictures / Media Rights Capital	Neill Blomkamp (director/screenplay); Matt Damon, Jodie Foster, Sharlto Copley, Wagner Moura, Alice Braga, Diego Luna, William Fichtner, Brandon Auret, Faran Tahir, Emma Tremblay, Jose Pablo Cantillo, Adrian Holmes, Jared Keeso, Carly Pope, Ona Grauer, Michael Shanks, Terry Chen, Maxwell Perry Cotton, Josh Blacker	
A U G U S T	9	Planes	Walt Disney Pictures	Klay Hall (director), Jeffrey M. Howard (screenplay); Dane Cook, Stacy Keach, Brad Garrett, Priyanka Chopra, Carlos Alazraqui, Roger Craig Smith, Teri Hatcher, David Croft, Julia Louis-Dreyfus, John Cleese, Colin Cowherd, Sinbad, Gabriel Iglesias, Oliver Kalkofe, Brent Musburger, Danny Mann, Cedric the Entertainer, Val Kilmer, Anthony Edwards, John Ratzenberger, Barney Harwood, Jonathan Adams, Jeff Bennett, Klay Hall, Fred Tatasciore, Emerson Tenney, Kari Wahlgren, Dave Wittenberg, Sirena Irwin, Pia Shah, Rob Paulsen	
A U G U S T	10	Clear History	HBO Films	Greg Mottola (director); Larry David, Alec Berg, David Mandel, Jeff Schaffer (screenplay); Larry David, Bill Hader, Jon Hamm, Kate Hudson, Michael Keaton, Danny McBride, Eva Mendes, Amy Ryan, J.B. Smoove, Philip Baker Hall, Liev Schreiber, Amy Landecker, Marianne Leone, Mike Cerrone, Lenny Clarke, Peter Farrelly, Jimmy Tingle, Albert M. Chan, Daniel Greene, Langston Kerman, Rick Malambri, Paul Scheer, Conan O'Brien, Chicago, Wolf Blitzer, Tom Kenny	
A U G U S T	14	This Is Martin Bonner	Monterey Media	Chad Hartigan (director/screenplay); Paul Eenhoorn, Richmond Arquette, Sam Buchanan, Robert Longstreet, Demetrius Grosse, Kristin Slaysman, Jan Haley	
A U G U S T	16	Ain't Them Bodies Saints	IFC Films	David Lowery (director/screenplay); Casey Affleck, Rooney Mara, Ben Foster, Rami Malek, Keith Carradine, Nate Parker, Charles Baker, Kentucker Audley, David Zellner, Frank Mosley, Annalee Jefferies, Kennadie Smith, Jacklynn Smith, Robert Longstreet, Augustine Frizzell, Turner Ross, Will Beinbrink, Steve Corner, Gwen Waymon, Artist Thornton	
A U G U S T	16	The Butler	The Weinstein Company	Lee Daniels (director); Danny Strong (screenplay); Forest Whitaker, Oprah Winfrey, Mariah Carey, John Cusack, Jane Fonda, Cuba Gooding Jr., Terrence Howard, Lenny Kravitz, James Marsden, David Oyelowo, Vanessa Redgrave, Alan Rickman, Liev Schreiber, Robin Williams, Clarence Williams III, Elijah Kelley, Alex Pettyfer, David Banner, Adriane Lenox, Yaya DaCosta, Colman Domingo, Minka Kelly, Stephen Rider, Nelsan Ellis, Jesse Williams, Danny Strong, Michael Rainey Jr., Aml Ameen, Joe Chrest, Dana Gourrier, Mo McRae, Nealla Gordon, Xosha Roquemore, Marco St. John, Gerald Ford, Jimmy Carter, Barack Obama, Jesse Jackson, Rosalynn Carter, Walter Cronkite, Redd Foxx, Ron Glass, Martin Luther King, Gladys Knight, Hal Linden, Mike Wallace, Demond Wilson	
A U G U S T	16	Jobs	Open Road Films	Joshua Michael Stern (director/screenplay); Matthew Whitely (screenplay); Ashton Kutcher, Dermot Mulroney, Josh Gad, Lukas Haas, J.K. Simmons, Matthew Modine, Victor Rasuk, Ron Eldard, David Denman, Ahna O'Reilly, John Getz, Nelson Franklin, Lesley Ann Warren, Elden Henson, Kevin Dunn, James Woods, Brad William Henke, Eddie Hassell, Lenny Jacobson, Giles Matthey, Brett Gelman, Abby Brammell, Ava Acres, Robert Pine, Amanda Crew, Masi Oka, Samm Levine, Joel Murray, William Mapother, Scott Krinsky, Evan Helmuth, Jim Turner, Clayton Rohner, Christopher Curry, Mark Kassen, Kent Shocknek, Olivia Jordan	
A U G U S T	16	Kick-Ass 2	Universal Pictures / Marv Films	Jeff Wadlow (director/screenplay); Matthew Vaughn (screenplay); Aaron Taylor-Johnson, Chloë Grace Moretz, Christopher Mintz-Plasse, John Leguizamo, Donald Faison, Robert Emms, Morris Chestnut, Lyndsy Fonseca, Lindy Booth, Jim Carrey, Clark Duke, Olga Kurkulina, Augustus Prew, Garrett M. Brown, Iain Glen, Steven Mackintosh, Monica Dolan, Andy Nyman, Daniel Kaluuya, Tom Wu, Yancy Butler, Claudia Lee, Ella Purnell, Benedict Wong, Sophie Wu, Amy Anzel, Tanya Fear, Trenyce Cobbins, Wesley Morgan, Enzo Cilenti, John Bregar, Martin Roach, John Schwab, Todd Boyce, Jesse Camacho, Rob Archer, Mark Millar, John Romita Jr., Chuck Liddell	
A U G U S T	16	Paranoia	Relativity Media / Reliance Entertainment / IM Global / Demarest Films	Robert Luketic (director); Barry Levy, Jason Dean Hall (screenplay); Liam Hemsworth, Gary Oldman, Amber Heard, Harrison Ford, Lucas Till, Embeth Davidtz, Julian McMahon, Josh Holloway, Richard Dreyfuss, Angela Sarafyan, William Peltz, Haley Finnegan, Kevin Kilner, Christine Marzano, Charlie Hofheimer, Mark Moses, Isidora Goreshter, Meredith Eaton, Brendan Dooling	
A U G U S T	21	The Mortal Instruments: City of Bones	Screen Gems / Constantin Film / Unique Features	Harald Zwart (director); Jessica Postigo, I. Marlene King (screenplay); Lily Collins, Jamie Campbell Bower, Robert Sheehan, Kevin Zegers, Lena Headey, Kevin Durand, Aidan Turner, Jemima West, Godfrey Gao, C.C.H. Pounder, Jared Harris, Jonathan Rhys Meyers, Robert Maillet, Harry Van Gorkum, Stephen Hart, Chad Connell, Elyas M'Barek, Pedro Miguel Arce, Christopher Maleki	
A U G U S T	23	Drinking Buddies	Magnolia Pictures	Joe Swanberg (director/screenplay); Olivia Wilde, Jake Johnson, Anna Kendrick, Ron Livingston, Ti West, Gene Dentler, Joe Swanberg	
A U G U S T	23	Scenic Route	Vertical Entertainment	Kevin Goetz, Michael Goetz (director); Kyle Killen (screenplay); Josh Duhamel, Dan Fogler, Miracle Laurie, Peter Michael Goetz, Christie Burson, Jamie Donovan, Ethan Maher	
A U G U S T	23	Short Term 12	Cinedigm Entertainment	Destin Daniel Cretton (director/screenplay); Brie Larson, John Gallagher Jr., Kaitlyn Dever, Rami Malek, Melora Walters, Stephanie Beatriz, Lydia Du Veaux, Alex Calloway, Frantz Turner, Lakeith Stanfield, Kevin Hernandez	
A U G U S T	23	The World's End	Focus Features / Relativity Media / Working Title Films	Edgar Wright (director/screenplay); Simon Pegg (screenplay); Simon Pegg, Nick Frost, Paddy Considine, Martin Freeman, Eddie Marsan, Rosamund Pike, Pierce Brosnan, Bill Nighy, David Bradley, Darren Boyd, Michael Smiley, Sophie Evans, Samantha White, Rose Reynolds, Steve Oram, Nicholas Burns, Reece Shearsmith, Alice Lowe, Rafe Spall, Mark Heap, Peter Serafinowicz, Thomas Law, James Tarpey	
A U G U S T	23	You're Next	Lionsgate	Adam Wingard (director); Simon Barrett (screenplay); Sharni Vinson, Nicholas Tucci, Wendy Glenn, A. J. Bowen, Joe Swanberg, Barbara Crampton, Rob Moran, Amy Seimetz, Ti West, Simon Barrett, Larry Fessenden, Kate Lyn Sheil, Sarah Myers, Lane Hughes, L.C. Holt, Calvin Reeder	
A U G U S T	27	Super Buddies	Walt Disney Studios Home Entertainment / Key Pix Productions	Robert Vince (director/screenplay); Anna McRoberts (screenplay); John Ratzenberger, Jay Brazeau, Jason Earles, John Michael Higgins, Tim Conway, Colin Hanks, Cooper Roth, G. Hannelius, Ty Panitz, Tenzing Trainor, Maulik Pancholy, Chris Coppola, Amy Sedaris, Debra Jo Rupp, Alyson Stoner, Zendaya, Atticus Shaffer, Fiona Gubelmann, Justin Roiland, Jonathan Morgan Heit, Kimberley Sustad, Ellie Harvie, Michael Teigen, Trey Loney, Veronica Diaz-Carranza, Jeremy Shinder, Brian T. Finney, Tatiana Gudegast, Sam Adler, Darien Provost, Harley Graham, Sean Mathieson, Jake Brennan	
A U G U S T	28	Closed Circuit	Focus Features / Working Title Films	John Crowley (director); Steven Knight (screenplay); Eric Bana, Rebecca Hall, Isaac Hempstead-Wright, Riz Ahmed, Jim Broadbent, Kenneth Cranham, Anne-Marie Duff, Ciarán Hinds, Julia Stiles, Doug Allen, Barbora Bobuľová, John Humphrys, Denis Moschitto, Jemma Powell, Angus Wright	
A U G U S T	30	Getaway	Warner Bros. Pictures / Dark Castle Entertainment / After Dark Films	Courtney Solomon, Yaron Levy (directors); Sean Finegan, Gregg Maxwell Parker (screenplay); Ethan Hawke, Selena Gomez, Jon Voight, Rebecca Budig, Bruce Payne, Paul Freeman, James Maslow	
A U G U S T	30	The Lifeguard	Screen Media Films	Liz W. Garcia (director/screenplay); Kristen Bell, David Lambert, Mamie Gummer, Martin Starr, Alex Shaffer, Joshua Harto, Amy Madigan, John Finn, Sendhil Ramamurthy, Adam LeFevre, Paulie Litt, Mike Landry	
S E P T E M B E R	6	Hell Baby	Gravitas Ventures	Robert Ben Garant, Thomas Lennon (director/screenplay); Rob Corddry, Leslie Bibb, Keegan-Michael Key, Riki Lindhome, Paul Scheer, Rob Huebel, Ben Garant, Thomas Lennon, Michael Ian Black, Kumail Nanjiani	
S E P T E M B E R	6	Riddick	Universal Pictures / One Race Films	David Twohy (director/screenplay); Vin Diesel, Karl Urban, Katee Sackhoff, Dave Bautista, Matt Nable, Jordi Mollà, Bokeem Woodbine, Raoul Trujillo, Nolan Gerard Funk, Noah Danby, Keri Hilson, Conrad Pla	
S E P T E M B E R	6	Touchy Feely	Magnolia Pictures	Lynn Shelton (director/screenplay); Rosemarie DeWitt, Elliot Page, Allison Janney, Ron Livingston, Scoot McNairy, Josh Pais, Alycia Delmore, Tomo Nakayama	
S E P T E M B E R	13	Insidious: Chapter 2	FilmDistrict / Blumhouse Productions	James Wan (director); Leigh Whannell (screenplay); Patrick Wilson, Rose Byrne, Lin Shaye, Ty Simpkins, Steven Coulter, Barbara Hershey, Leigh Whannell, Angus Sampson, Danielle Bisutti, Michael Beach, J. LaRose, Edwina Findley, Stephanie Pearson, Jorge Pallo, Priscilla Garita, Jenna Ortega, Hank Harris, Jocelin Donahue, Andrew Astor, Brynn and Madison Bowie, Tom Fitzpatrick, Brooke Peoples, Dannay Rodriguez, Garrett Ryan, Lindsay Seim, Tyler James Griffin	
S E P T E M B E R	17	Dick Figures: The Movie	Mondo Media	Ed Skudder, Zack Keller (director and screenplay); Ed Skudder, Zack Keller, Eric Bauza, Ben Tuller, Shea Carter, Mike Nassar, Chad Quandt, and Lauren K. Sokolov	
S E P T E M B E R	20	Battle of the Year	Screen Gems	Benson Lee (director); Brin Hill, Chris Parker (screenplay); Josh Holloway, Laz Alonso, Josh Peck, Caity Lotz, Chris Brown, Terrence Jenkins, Weronika Rosati, Steve Terada, Terrence J, Sway Calloway, Dominic Sandoval, Jon Cruz, Ivan Velez, Richard Carmelo Soto, Anis Cheurfa, Alex Martin, Victor Kim, Jesse Brown, David Shreibman, Luis Rosado, Sawandi Wilson	
S E P T E M B E R	20	Enough Said	Fox Searchlight Pictures	Nicole Holofcener (director); Anthony Bregman, Stefanie Azpiazu (screenplay); James Gandolfini, Julia Louis-Dreyfus, Toni Collette, Catherine Keener, Ben Falcone, Toby Huss, Michaela Watkins, Anjelah Johnson, Eve Hewson, Amy Landecker, Christopher Nicholas Smith, Jessica St. Clair, Barry Jenner, Kathleen Rose Perkins, Tavi Gevinson, Sarah Burns, Rebecca Drysdale, Rob Mayes, Lennie Loftin, Tracey Fairaway, Phillip Brock	
S E P T E M B E R	20	Prisoners	Warner Bros. Pictures / Alcon Entertainment	Denis Villeneuve (director); Aaron Guzikowski (screenplay); Jake Gyllenhaal, Hugh Jackman, Paul Dano, Melissa Leo, Viola Davis, Maria Bello, Terrence Howard, Dennis Christopher, Dylan Minnette, David Dastmalchian, Brad James, Zoë Soul, Wayne Duvall, Len Cariou, Erin Gerasimovich, Kyla-Drew Simmons, Jeff Pope	
S E P T E M B E R	20	Rush	Universal Pictures / Cross Creek Pictures / Exclusive Media / Working Title Films / Imagine Entertainment	Ron Howard (director); Peter Morgan (screenplay); Chris Hemsworth, Daniel Brühl, Olivia Wilde, Alexandra Maria Lara, Pierfrancesco Favino, David Calder, Natalie Dormer, Stephen Mangan, Christian McKay, Alistair Petrie, Colin Stinton, Julian Rhind-Tutt, Jamie de Courcey, Patrick Baladi, Vincent Riotta, Martin Savage, Jamie Sives, Tom Wlaschiha, Cristian Solimeno, James Norton, Joséphine de La Baume, Geoffrey Streatfeild, Douglas Reith, Hannah Britland, Lisa McAllister, Akira Koieyama, Demetri Goritsas, Erich Redman, James Hunt, Niki Lauda	
S E P T E M B E R	20	The Wizard of Oz 3D	Warner Bros. Pictures / Metro-Goldwyn-Mayer	Victor Fleming (director); Noel Langley, Florence Ryerson, Edgar Allan Woolf (screenplay); Judy Garland, Frank Morgan, Ray Bolger, Bert Lahr, Jack Haley, Billie Burke, Margaret Hamilton, Charley Grapewin, Clara Blandick, Pat Walshe, Terry, Adriana Caselotti, Charlie Becker, Mickey Carroll, Lewis Croft, Billy Curtis, Prince Denis, Daisy Earles, Gracie Doll Earles, Harry Doll Earles, Tiny Doll Earles, Ruth Robinson Duccini, Jakob "Jackie" Gerlich, Clarence C. Howerton, Jerry Maren, Matina Brothers, Harry Monty, Olga C. Nardone, Margaret Williams Pellegrini, Meinhardt Raabe, Margaret Raia, Karl Slover, Clarence Swensen	
S E P T E M B E R	27	Baggage Claim	Fox Searchlight Pictures	David E. Talbert (director/screenplay); Paula Patton, Derek Luke, Taye Diggs, Jill Scott, Boris Kodjoe, Trey Songz, Adam Brody, Tia Mowry, La La Anthony, Djimon Hounsou, Jenifer Lewis, Ned Beatty, Lauren London, Christina Milian, Jim Whetstone, Rickey Smiley, Terrence Jenkins, Affion Crockett, Tyler Lepley, Magda Harout	
S E P T E M B E R	27	Cloudy with a Chance of Meatballs 2	Columbia Pictures / Sony Pictures Animation	Cody Cameron, Kris Pearn (directors); John Francis Daley, Jonathan M. Goldstein, Erica Rivinoja (screenplay); Bill Hader, Anna Faris, James Caan, Will Forte, Andy Samberg, Benjamin Bratt, Neil Patrick Harris, Terry Crews, Kristen Schaal, Cody Cameron, Khamani Griffin, Al Roker, Melissa Sturm, Kris Pearn, Craig Kellman, Bridget Hoffman, Eddie Frierson, Elisa Gabrielli, Tania Gunadi, Walter Jones, Scott Menville, David Sheinkopf, Marina Squerciati, Kelly Stables, Shane Sweet, Matthew Taylor	
S E P T E M B E R	27	Don Jon	Relativity Media	Joseph Gordon-Levitt (director/screenplay); Joseph Gordon-Levitt, Scarlett Johansson, Julianne Moore, Rob Brown, Glenne Headly, Brie Larson, Tony Danza, Jeremy Luke, Paul Ben-Victor, Lindsey Broad, Anne Hathaway, Channing Tatum, Meagan Good, Cuba Gooding Jr., Sarah Dumont, Italia Ricci, Loanne Bishop, Rizwan Manji, Nina Agdal, Becky O'Donohue, Tanya Mityushina	
S E P T E M B E R	27	Metallica: Through the Never	Picturehouse	Nimród Antal (director/screenplay); Dane DeHaan, Lars Ulrich, Kirk Hammett, James Hetfield, Robert Trujillo, Mackenzie Gray	

== October–December ==
Opening		Title	Production company	Cast and crew	Ref.
O C T O B E R	1	1	Exclusive Media	Paul Crowder (director); Mark Monroe (screenplay); Michael Fassbender	
O C T O B E R	4	Grace Unplugged	Lionsgate / Roadside Attractions	Brad J. Silverman (director/screenplay); Brandon Rice (screenplay); AJ Michalka, James Denton, Kevin Pollak, Shawnee Smith, Chris Ellis, Michael Welch, Jamie Grace, Emma Catherwood, Kelly Thiebaud, Pia Toscano, Zane Holtz, Chris Tomlin, Madison Wolfe	
O C T O B E R	4	Gravity	Warner Bros. Pictures	Alfonso Cuarón (director/screenplay); Jonás Cuarón (screenplay); Sandra Bullock, George Clooney, Ed Harris, Phaldut Sharma, Orto Ignatiussen, Amy Warren, Basher Savage	
O C T O B E R	4	Runner Runner	20th Century Fox / Regency Enterprises	Brad Furman (director); Brian Koppelman, David Levien (screenplay); Ben Affleck, Justin Timberlake, Gemma Arterton, Anthony Mackie, Michael Esper, Oliver Cooper, Yul Vazquez, John Heard, Louis Lombardi, Vincent Laresca, Sam Palladio, David Costabile, Bob Gunton, Ben Schwartz, Dayo Okeniyi, Christian George, James Molina, Bernie O. Ramos Robledo, Jordan Beder	
O C T O B E R	5	Muhammad Ali's Greatest Fight	HBO Films / Rainmark Films / Sakura Films	Stephen Frears (director); Shawn Slovo (screenplay); Christopher Plummer, Frank Langella, Ed Begley Jr., Peter Gerety, Barry Levinson, John Bedford Lloyd, Fritz Weaver, Harris Yulin, Danny Glover, Benjamin Walker, Pablo Schreiber, Ben Steinfeld, Dana Ivey, Kathleen Chalfant, Lisa Joyce, Peter McRobbie, Damian Young, Chuck Cooper, Victor Slezak, Justin Swain, Nate Dern, James Francis Ginty, Keith Nobbs, Drew Gehling, Alex Dreier, Jon Gabrus, Lizan Mitchell, Muhammad Ali, Woody Allen, Diane Keaton, Bob Balaban	
O C T O B E R	11	Captain Phillips	Columbia Pictures	Paul Greengrass (director); Billy Ray (screenplay); Tom Hanks, Catherine Keener, Max Martini, Yul Vazquez, Michael Chernus, Chris Mulkey, Corey Johnson, David Warshofsky, John Magaro, Angus MacInnes, Mark Holden, Louis Mahoney, Vincenzo Nicoli, Maria Dizzia, Riann Steele, Barkhad Abdi, Faysal Ahmed, Omar Berdouni, Gigi Raines, Barkhad Abdirahman, Mahat M. Ali, Mohamed Ali, Ibrahim Maalim, Idurus Shiish, Azeez Mohammed, Nasir Jamas	
O C T O B E R	11	Machete Kills	Open Road Films	Robert Rodriguez (director); Kyle Ward (screenplay); Danny Trejo, Michelle Rodriguez, Sofía Vergara, Vanessa Hudgens, Amber Heard, Antonio Banderas, Cuba Gooding Jr., Walton Goggins, William Sadler, Demián Bichir, Mel Gibson, Lady Gaga, Jessica Alba, Alexa Vega, Carlos Estévez, Marko Zaror, Tom Savini, Julio Oscar Mechoso, Callie Hernandez, Patricia Vonne, Elle LaMont, Electra and Elise Avellan, Corey Burton, Elon Musk, John Paul DeJoria, Jesse James, Cheech Marin, J.J. Perry	
O C T O B E R	11	Romeo & Juliet	Relativity Media	Carlo Carlei (director); Julian Fellowes (screenplay); Hailee Steinfeld, Douglas Booth, Damian Lewis, Natascha McElhone, Lesley Manville, Ed Westwick, Tomas Arana, Laura Morante, Kodi Smit-McPhee, Paul Giamatti, Christian Cooke, Tom Wisdom, Leon Vitali, Stellan Skarsgård, Anton Alexander, Simona Caparrini, Nathalie Rapti Gomez	
O C T O B E R	18	12 Years a Slave	Fox Searchlight Pictures / Regency Enterprises / River Road Entertainment / Plan B Entertainment / Film4 Productions	Steve McQueen (director); John Ridley (screenplay); Chiwetel Ejiofor, Michael Fassbender, Benedict Cumberbatch, Paul Dano, Paul Giamatti, Lupita Nyong'o, Brad Pitt, Alfre Woodard, Sarah Paulson, Garret Dillahunt, Scoot McNairy, Adepero Oduye, Michael Kenneth Williams, Chris Chalk, Taran Killam, Bill Camp, J.D. Evermore, Christopher Berry, Rob Steinberg, Bryan Batt, Tom Proctor, Jay Huguley, Storm Reid, Quvenzhané Wallis, Dwight Henry	
O C T O B E R	18	Escape Plan	Summit Entertainment / Emmett/Furla Oasis Films	Mikael Håfström (director); Miles Chapman, Jason Keller (screenplay); Sylvester Stallone, Arnold Schwarzenegger, Jim Caviezel, Curtis "50 Cent" Jackson, Vinnie Jones, Vincent D'Onofrio, Amy Ryan, Sam Neill, Faran Tahir, Graham Beckel, Matt Gerald, Caitriona Balfe	
O C T O B E R	18	Carrie	Screen Gems / Metro-Goldwyn-Mayer	Kimberly Peirce (director); Lawrence D. Cohen, Roberto Aguirre-Sacasa (screenplay); Chloë Grace Moretz, Julianne Moore, Gabriella Wilde, Portia Doubleday, Judy Greer, Ansel Elgort, Alex Russell, Cynthia Preston, Michelle Nolden, Barry Shabaka Henley, Zoë Belkin, Karissa Strain, Katie Strain, Samantha Weinstein, Demetrius Joyette, Mouna Traoré, Hart Bochner	
O C T O B E R	18	The Fifth Estate	Touchstone Pictures / DreamWorks Pictures / Reliance Entertainment / Participant Media	Bill Condon (director); Josh Singer (screenplay); Benedict Cumberbatch, Daniel Brühl, Anthony Mackie, David Thewlis, Alicia Vikander, Stanley Tucci, Laura Linney, Moritz Bleibtreu, Carice van Houten, Peter Capaldi, Dan Stevens, Alexander Beyer, Alexander Siddig, Philip Bretherton, Lydia Leonard, Hera Hilmar, Nigel Whitmey, Peter Nzioki, Joseph Muriuki	
O C T O B E R	18	I'm in Love with a Church Girl	Reverence Gospel Media Films	Steve Race (director); Galley Molina (screenplay); Ja Rule, Adrienne Bailon, Vincent Pastore, TobyMac, T-Bone, Michael Madsen, Stephen Baldwin	
O C T O B E R	25	The Counselor	20th Century Fox / Fox 2000 Pictures / Scott Free Productions	Ridley Scott (director); Cormac McCarthy (screenplay); Michael Fassbender, Penélope Cruz, Cameron Diaz, Javier Bardem, Brad Pitt, Rosie Perez, Natalie Dormer, John Leguizamo, Dean Norris, Édgar Ramírez, Bruno Ganz, Rubén Blades, Goran Višnjić, Velibor Topić, Toby Kebbell, Emma Rigby, Richard Cabral, Sam Spruell, Alex Hafner, Andrea Deck	
O C T O B E R	25	Jackass Presents: Bad Grandpa	Paramount Pictures / MTV Films / Dickhouse Productions	Jeff Tremaine (director/screenplay); Johnny Knoxville, Spike Jonze (screenplay); Johnny Knoxville, Bam Margera, Steve-O, Jason Acuña, Chris Pontius, Preston Lacy, Dave England, Ehren McGhehey, Spike Jonze, Catherine Keener, Jackson Nicoll, Georgina Cates	
N O V E M B E R	1	About Time	Universal Pictures / Relativity Media / Working Title Films	Richard Curtis (director/screenplay); Domhnall Gleeson, Rachel McAdams, Bill Nighy, Tom Hollander, Margot Robbie, Lindsay Duncan, Lydia Wilson, Richard Cordery, Joshua McGuire, Tom Hughes, Vanessa Kirby, Will Merrick, Lisa Eichhorn, Harry Hadden-Paton, Jenny Rainsford, Richard Griffiths, Richard E. Grant, Clemmie Dugdale, Mitchell Mullen	
N O V E M B E R	1	Dallas Buyers Club	Focus Features	Jean-Marc Vallée (director); Craig Borten, Melisa Wallack (screenplay); Matthew McConaughey, Jared Leto, Jennifer Garner, Dallas Roberts, Denis O'Hare, Steve Zahn, Griffin Dunne, Jane McNeill, James DuMont, Bradford Cox, Kevin Rankin, Matthew Thompson, Michael O'Neill, Scott Takeda, Adam Dunn	
N O V E M B E R	1	Ender's Game	Summit Entertainment / OddLot Entertainment	Gavin Hood (director/screenplay); Asa Butterfield, Harrison Ford, Ben Kingsley, Viola Davis, Hailee Steinfeld, Abigail Breslin, Nonso Anozie, Aramis Knight, Moisés Arias, Khylin Rhambo, Jimmy Pinchak, Brandon Soo Hoo, Orson Scott Card, Suraj Parthasarathy, Conor Carroll, Stevie Ray Dallimore, Andrea Powell, Kyle Russell Clements	
N O V E M B E R	1	Free Birds	Relativity Media / Reel FX Animation Studios	Jimmy Hayward (director/screenplay); Scott Mosier (screenplay); Owen Wilson, Woody Harrelson, Amy Poehler, George Takei, Colm Meaney, Keith David, Dan Fogler, Jimmy Hayward, Kaitlyn Maher, Carlos Alazraqui, Jeff Biancalana, Danny Carey, Carlos Ponce, Robert Beltran, Lesley Nicol, Jason Finazzo, Scott Mosier, Lauren Bowles, Dwight Howard, Josh Lawson, W. Morgan Sheppard, Elisa Gabrielli	
N O V E M B E R	1	Last Vegas	CBS Films	Jon Turteltaub (director); Dan Fogelman (screenplay); Michael Douglas, Robert De Niro, Morgan Freeman, Kevin Kline, Mary Steenburgen, Jerry Ferrara, Romany Malco, Roger Bart, Joanna Gleason, Michael Ealy, Bre Blair, Ashley Spillers, Edward Edwards, Ray Abruzzo, Weronika Rosati, Curtis "50 Cent" Jackson, Stefan "Redfoo" Gordy, Ric Reitz, Jena Sims, Dan Hewitt Owens	
N O V E M B E R	8	The Book Thief	20th Century Fox / Fox 2000 Pictures	Brian Percival (director); Michael Petroni (screenplay); Sophie Nélisse, Geoffrey Rush, Emily Watson, Nico Liersch, Ben Schnetzer, Heike Makatsch, Barbara Auer, Roger Allam, Godehard Giese, Oliver Stokowski, Sandra Nedeleff, Hildegard Schroedter, Rafael Gareisen, Levin Liam, Carina Wiese, Julian Lehmann, Martin Ontrop, Gotthard Lange	
N O V E M B E R	8	Thor: The Dark World	Marvel Studios	Alan Taylor (director); Christopher Yost, Stephen McFeely, Christopher Markus (screenplay); Chris Hemsworth, Natalie Portman, Tom Hiddleston, Stellan Skarsgård, Idris Elba, Christopher Eccleston, Adewale Akinnuoye-Agbaje, Kat Dennings, Ray Stevenson, Zachary Levi, Tadanobu Asano, Jaimie Alexander, Rene Russo, Anthony Hopkins, Alice Krige, Clive Russell, Jonathan Howard, Sam Swainsbury, Royce Pierreson, Chris O'Dowd, Justin Edwards, Richard Brake, Stan Lee, Steve Scott, Brett Tucker, Talulah Riley, Richard Wharton, Greg Chun, Tony Curran, Benicio del Toro, Chris Evans, Aiko Horiuchi, Ophelia Lovibond, Julian Stone	
N O V E M B E R	15	The Best Man Holiday	Universal Pictures	Malcolm D. Lee (director/screenplay); Taye Diggs, Nia Long, Morris Chestnut, Harold Perrineau, Terrence Howard, Regina Hall, Sanaa Lathan, Monica Calhoun, Melissa De Sousa, Eddie Cibrian, John Michael Higgins, Riele Downs, Millie Davis, Catherine Bruhier, Chris Williams, Shailyn Pierre-Dixon, Shailene Garnett, Isis Moore, Miles J. Stroter	
N O V E M B E R	15	The Christmas Candle	EchoLight Studios	John Stephenson (director); Candace Lee, Eric Newman, Max Lucado (screenplay); Hans Matheson, Samantha Barks, Lesley Manville, Sylvester McCoy, James Cosmo, Susan Boyle, Barbara Flynn, John Hannah	
N O V E M B E R	22	Contracted	IFC Films	Eric England (director/screenplay); Najarra Townsend, Caroline Williams, Alice Macdonald	
N O V E M B E R	22	Delivery Man	Touchstone Pictures / DreamWorks Pictures / Reliance Entertainment	Ken Scott (director/screenplay); Vince Vaughn, Chris Pratt, Cobie Smulders, Andrzej Blumenfeld, Simon Delaney, Bobby Moynihan, Dave Patten, Adam Chanler-Berat, Britt Robertson, Jack Reynor, Matthew Daddario, Jessica Williams, Damian Young, Richard Poe, Bruce Altman, Glenn Fleshler, Jay Leno, Bill Maher, Madison McGrew, Amos VanderPoel	
N O V E M B E R	22	The Hunger Games: Catching Fire	Lionsgate	Francis Lawrence (director); Simon Beaufoy, Michael Arndt (screenplay); Jennifer Lawrence, Josh Hutcherson, Liam Hemsworth, Woody Harrelson, Elizabeth Banks, Lenny Kravitz, Philip Seymour Hoffman, Jeffrey Wright, Stanley Tucci, Donald Sutherland, Toby Jones, Willow Shields, Jack Quaid, Sam Claflin, Lynn Cohen, Jena Malone, Amanda Plummer, Meta Golding, Bruno Gunn, Alan Ritchson, Patrick St. Esprit, Paula Malcomson, Stef Dawson, Nelson Ascencio, E. Roger Mitchell, Afemo Omilami, Wilbur Fitzgerald, Maria Howell, Daniel Bernhardt, William Tokarsky, Stephanie Leigh Schlund, Bruce Bundy	
N O V E M B E R	22	Nebraska	Summit Entertainment / Paramount Vantage	Alexander Payne (director); Bob Nelson (screenplay); Bruce Dern, Will Forte, Bob Odenkirk, Stacy Keach, June Squibb, Mary Louise Wilson, Angela McEwan, Rance Howard, Devin Ratray, Tim Driscoll, Melinda Simonsen	
N O V E M B E R	22	Philomena	The Weinstein Company / Pathé / BBC Films / BFI Film Forever	Stephen Frears (director); Steve Coogan, Jeff Pope (screenplay); Judi Dench, Steve Coogan, Michelle Fairley, Barbara Jefford, Anna Maxwell Martin, Mare Winningham, Sophie Kennedy Clark, Kate Fleetwood, Simone Lahbib, Cathy Belton, Charlie Murphy, Amy McAllister, Sean Mahon, Peter Hermann	
N O V E M B E R	27	Black Nativity	Fox Searchlight Pictures	Kasi Lemmons (director/screenplay); Forest Whitaker, Angela Bassett, Tyrese Gibson, Jennifer Hudson, Mary J. Blige, Vondie Curtis-Hall, Nas, Rotimi, Jacob Latimore, Luke James, Grace Gibson	
N O V E M B E R	27	Frozen	Walt Disney Pictures / Walt Disney Animation Studios	Chris Buck (director); Jennifer Lee (director/screenplay); Kristen Bell, Idina Menzel, Josh Gad, Jonathan Groff, Alan Tudyk, Santino Fontana, Chris Williams, Ciarán Hinds, Maia Wilson, Paul Briggs, Maurice LaMarche, Jennifer Lee, Eva Bella, Frank Welker, Stephen Anderson, Edie McClurg, Robert Pine, Jesse Corti, Ava Acres, Annaleigh Ashford, Kirk Baily, Lewis Cleale, Eddie Frierson, Jean Gilpin, Nicholas Guest, Bridget Hoffman, Nick Jameson, John Lavelle, Katie Lowes, Mona Marshall, Scott Menville, Paul Pape, Courtney Peldon, Raymond S. Persi, Katie Silverman, Fred Tatasciore, Jack Whitehall	
N O V E M B E R	27	Homefront	Open Road Films / Millennium Films / Nu Image	Gary Fleder (director); Sylvester Stallone (screenplay); Jason Statham, James Franco, Winona Ryder, Kate Bosworth, Frank Grillo, Izabela Vidovic, Chuck Zito, Clancy Brown, Rachelle Lefevre, Omar Benson Miller, Pruitt Taylor Vince, Lance E. Nichols, Marcus Hester, Austin Craig, Linds Edwards	
N O V E M B E R	27	Oldboy	FilmDistrict	Spike Lee (director); Mark Protosevich (screenplay); Samuel L. Jackson, Elizabeth Olsen, Josh Brolin, Sharlto Copley, Michael Imperioli, James Ransone, Max Casella, Linda Emond, Pom Klementieff, Elvis Nolasco, Lance Reddick, Hannah Ware, Richard Portnow, Hannah Simone, Caitlin Dulany, Cinqué Lee, Rami Malek, Ciera Payton, Grey Damon, Elvy Yost, Lizzy DeClement, Steven Hauck, Erik Gersovitz, Brett Lapeyrouse	
D E C E M B E R	6	Crave	Phase 4 Films	Charles de Lauzirika (director/screenplay); Robert A. Lawton (screenplay); Josh Lawson, Emma Lung, Ron Perlman	
D E C E M B E R	6	Inside Llewyn Davis	CBS Films	Joel Coen, Ethan Coen (director/screenplay); Oscar Isaac, Carey Mulligan, John Goodman, Garrett Hedlund, F. Murray Abraham, Justin Timberlake, Adam Driver, Stark Sands, Ethan Phillips, Robin Bartlett, Alex Karpovsky, Max Casella, Frank L. Ridley, Marcus Mumford, Jerry Grayson, Jeanine Serralles, Ben Pike, Bradley Mott	
D E C E M B E R	6	Out of the Furnace	Relativity Media / Scott Free Productions / Appian Way Productions	Scott Cooper (director/screenplay); Brad Ingelsby (screenplay); Christian Bale, Woody Harrelson, Casey Affleck, Forest Whitaker, Willem Dafoe, Zoë Saldana, Sam Shepard, Tom Bower, Bingo O'Malley, Boyd Holbrook	
D E C E M B E R	13	American Hustle	Columbia Pictures / Atlas Entertainment / Annapurna Pictures	David O. Russell (director/screenplay); Eric Warren Singer (screenplay); Christian Bale, Bradley Cooper, Amy Adams, Jeremy Renner, Jennifer Lawrence, Louis C.K., Michael Peña, Alessandro Nivola, Jack Huston, Elisabeth Röhm, Shea Whigham, Paul Herman, Saïd Taghmaoui, Adrian Martinez, Colleen Camp, Dawn Olivieri, Erica McDermott, Robert De Niro	
D E C E M B E R	13	The Hobbit: The Desolation of Smaug	Warner Bros. Pictures / New Line Cinema / Metro-Goldwyn-Mayer	Peter Jackson (director/screenplay); Fran Walsh, Philippa Boyens, Guillermo del Toro (screenplay); Martin Freeman, Ian McKellen, Richard Armitage, Benedict Cumberbatch, Evangeline Lilly, Lee Pace, Luke Evans, Ken Stott, James Nesbitt, Orlando Bloom, Stephen Fry, Graham McTavish, Aidan Turner, Dean O'Gorman, Mark Hadlow, Jed Brophy, Adam Brown, John Callen, Peter Hambleton, William Kircher, Stephen Hunter, Cate Blanchett, Mikael Persbrandt, Sylvester McCoy, Manu Bennett, Lawrence Makoare, Craig Hall, Ryan Gage, John Bell, Ben Mitchell, Ed Sheeran, Antony Sher, Peter Jackson, Kiran Shah, Stephen Colbert, Zane Weiner, Jabez Olssen, Brian Sergent, Peter Vere-Jones, Sarah Peirse, Matt Smith, Greg Ellis, Ray Henwood, Evelyn McGee, Mark Atkin, Erana James, Terry Notary, Shane Rangi, Marco Sinigaglia, Jeffrey Thomas, Karen Thompson, Royd Tolkien, Mark Mitchinson, Stephen Ure, Robin Kerr, Simon London, Dallas Barnett	
D E C E M B E R	13	A Madea Christmas	Lionsgate / Tyler Perry Studios	Tyler Perry (director/screenplay); Tyler Perry, Kathy Najimy, Chad Michael Murray, Anna Maria Horsford, Tika Sumpter, Eric Lively, JR Lemon, Alicia Witt, Lisa Whelchel, Larry the Cable Guy, Noah Urrea, Sweet Brown, Antoine Dodson, Jonathan Chase, Vickie Eng	
D E C E M B E R	13	Saving Mr. Banks	Walt Disney Pictures	John Lee Hancock (director); Kelly Marcel, Sue Smith (screenplay); Tom Hanks, Emma Thompson, Colin Farrell, Paul Giamatti, Jason Schwartzman, Bradley Whitford, Ruth Wilson, B. J. Novak, Kathy Baker, Melanie Paxson, Rachel Griffiths, Ronan Vibert, Michelle Arthur, Paul Tassone, Luke Baines, Demetrius Grosse, Kristopher Kyer, Victoria Summer, Hermione Baddeley, Karen Dotrice, Matthew Garber, Glynis Johns, David Tomlinson, P.L. Travers, Annie Rose Buckley	
D E C E M B E R	18	Anchorman 2: The Legend Continues	Paramount Pictures / Gary Sanchez Productions / Apatow Productions	Adam McKay (director/screenplay); Will Ferrell (screenplay); Will Ferrell, Christina Applegate, Paul Rudd, David Koechner, Steve Carell, Dylan Baker, Meagan Good, James Marsden, Fred Willard, Kristen Wiig, Josh Lawson, Chris Parnell, Greg Kinnear, Harrison Ford, June Diane Raphael, Eliza Coupe, Brian F. Durkin, Paula Pell, Drake, Sacha Baron Cohen, Marion Cotillard, Will Smith, Kirsten Dunst, Jim Carrey, Tina Fey, Liam Neeson, Amy Poehler, John C. Reilly, Vince Vaughn, Kanye West, Bill Kurtis, William Tokarsky, Wilbur Fitzgerald, Judah Nelson	
D E C E M B E R	18	Her	Warner Bros. Pictures / Annapurna Pictures	Spike Jonze (director/screenplay); Joaquin Phoenix, Amy Adams, Rooney Mara, Olivia Wilde, Scarlett Johansson, Matt Letscher, Luka Jones, Chris Pratt, Kristen Wiig, Bill Hader, Portia Doubleday, Brian Cox, Spike Jonze, Steve Zissis, Soko, Alia Janine	
D E C E M B E R	20	Walking with Dinosaurs	20th Century Fox / Reliance Entertainment / BBC Earth Films	Neil Nightingale, Barry Cook (directors); John Collee (screenplay); John Leguizamo, Justin Long, Tiya Sircar, Skyler Stone, Charlie Rowe, Angourie Rice, Karl Urban, Mary Mouser, Katie Silverman	
D E C E M B E R	25	47 Ronin	Universal Pictures / Relativity Media	Carl Rinsch (director); Chris Morgan, Hossein Amini (screenplay); Keanu Reeves, Hiroyuki Sanada, Kou Shibasaki, Tadanobu Asano, Rinko Kikuchi, Min Tanaka, Cary-Hiroyuki Tagawa, Jin Akanishi, Masayoshi Haneda, Yorick van Wageningen, Masayuki Deai, Togo Igawa, Gedde Watanabe, Rick Genest, Hiroshi Sogabe, Takato Yonemoto, Hiroshi Yamada, Shu Nakajima, Natsuki Kunimoto, Ron Bottitta	
D E C E M B E R	25	Grudge Match	Warner Bros. Pictures	Peter Segal (director); Tim Kelleher, Rodney Rothman (screenplay); Sylvester Stallone, Robert De Niro, Alan Arkin, Kevin Hart, Kim Basinger, Jon Bernthal, LL Cool J, Anthony Anderson, Joey Diaz, Barry Primus, Don Lake, Paul Ben-Victor, Mykel Shannon Jenkins, Greg Plitt, Kate Reinders, Griff Furst, Frank Pesce, Ireland Basinger Baldwin, Jim Lampley, Steve Levy, John Buccigross, Mike Goldberg, Chael Sonnen, Larry Merchant, Roy Jones Jr., Michael Buffer, Mike Tyson, Evander Holyfield, Manny Pacquiao	
D E C E M B E R	25	Lone Survivor	Universal Pictures / Emmett/Furla Oasis Films	Peter Berg (director/screenplay); Mark Wahlberg, Taylor Kitsch, Ben Foster, Emile Hirsch, Eric Bana, Ali Suliman, Alexander Ludwig, Marcus Luttrell, Sammy Sheik, Dan Bilzerian, Jerry Ferrara, Scott Elrod, Rohan Chand, Corey Large, Yousuf Azami, Rich Ting, Zarin Mohammad Rahimi, Nicholas Patel, Daniel Arroyo	
D E C E M B E R	25	The Secret Life of Walter Mitty	20th Century Fox / Samuel Goldwyn Films	Ben Stiller (director); Steve Conrad (screenplay); Ben Stiller, Kristen Wiig, Shirley MacLaine, Adam Scott, Kathryn Hahn, Sean Penn, Patton Oswalt, Adrian Martinez, Ólafur Darri Ólafsson, Jon Daly, Conan O'Brien, Andy Richter, Joey Slotnick, Radio Man, Paul Fitzgerald, Alex Anfanger, Amy Stiller, Stuart Cornfeld, Liz Mikel, Dion Graham, Greg Cipes, Shade Rupe, Tara Strong, Hynden Walch, Terence Bernie Hines, Marcus Antturi, Kai Lennox	
D E C E M B E R	25	The Wolf of Wall Street	Paramount Pictures / Red Granite Pictures	Martin Scorsese (director); Terence Winter (screenplay); Leonardo DiCaprio, Jonah Hill, Matthew McConaughey, Kyle Chandler, Jean Dujardin, Margot Robbie, Jon Bernthal, Rob Reiner, P.J. Byrne, Jon Favreau, Joanna Lumley, Cristin Milioti, Christine Ebersole, Shea Whigham, Katarina Čas, Stephanie Kurtzuba, Kenneth Choi, Brian Sacca, Henry Zebrowski, Ethan Suplee, Jake Hoffman, Mackenzie Meehan, Bo Dietl, Jon Spinogatti, Aya Cash, Jordan Belfort, Catherine Curtin, Stephen Kunken, Barry Rothbart, Danny Flaherty, Ted Griffin, Steven Boyer, Danny A. Abeckaser, J.C. MacKenzie, Ashlie Atkinson, Thomas Middleditch, Fran Lebowitz, Spike Jonze, Giselle Eisenberg	
D E C E M B E R	27	August: Osage County	The Weinstein Company	John Wells (director); Tracy Letts (screenplay); Julia Roberts, Meryl Streep, Ewan McGregor, Chris Cooper, Abigail Breslin, Benedict Cumberbatch, Juliette Lewis, Margo Martindale, Dermot Mulroney, Julianne Nicholson, Sam Shepard, Misty Upham, Dale Dye	
D E C E M B E R	27	Labor Day	Paramount Pictures	Jason Reitman (director/screenplay); Kate Winslet, Josh Brolin, Gattlin Griffith, Tobey Maguire, Clark Gregg, Brooke Smith, James Van Der Beek, J.K. Simmons, Maika Monroe, Alexie Gilmore, Lucas Hedges, Micah Fowler, Elena Kampouris, Marceline Hugot, Marva Hicks, Dylan Minnette, Brighid Fleming, Tom Lipinski	

== See also ==
- 2013 in American television
- 2013 in the United States
