= 2013 Champs-Élysées Film Festival =

- Official poster of the 2nd Champs-Élysées Film Festival
- Opening film: Struck by Lightning
- Closing film: Imogene
- Location: Paris, France
- Founded: 2012
- Awards: Audience Prize: Best American Independent Feature-Length Film (How To Make Money Selling Drugs)
- Hosted by: Julie Gayet & Olivier Martinez
- No. of films: 9 (Feature-Length Films in Competition); 11 (French Short Films in Competition); 23 (American Short Films in Competition)
- Festival date: 12–18 June 2013
- Website: champselyseesfilmfestival.com

The second edition of the Champs-Élysées Film Festival was held from 12 to 18 June 2013, with actors Olivier Martinez and Julie Gayet presiding. Struck by Lightning, by Brian Daddelly, was screened at the Opening Ceremony, while Shari Springer Berman and Robert Pulcini's Imogene was shown at the Closing Ceremony. Along with its competitive Official Selections for American feature-length films, American Shorts and French Shorts, the Festival presented a wide selection of important American and French movie premieres, a 7-film Brad Pitt retrospective to mark the release of World War Z and The TCM Cinema Essentials, a thirteen-film selection of American and French classics. Three Audience Prizes (Best American Feature-Length Film, Best American Short Film, Best French Short Film) were presented during the Closing Ceremony, held at the Publicis Cinema.

== Official Selection of American Independent Films ==
- I Am I, directed by Jocelyn Towne
- Blood Pressure, directed by Sean Garrity
- Hide Your Smiling Faces, directed by Daniel Patrick Carbone
- How To Make Money Selling Drugs, directed by Matthew Cooke
- Any Day Now, directed by Travis Fine
- Coldwater, directed by Vincent Grashaw
- Decoding Annie Parker, directed by Steven Bernstein
- It Felt Like Love, directed by Eliza Hittman
- Thanks for Sharing, directed by Stuart Blumberg

== Official Selection of Short Films ==
=== French Shorts Competitive Selection ===
French Shorts Selection

- Désolée Pour Hier Soir, directed by Hortense Gelinet
- Suzanne, directed by Wilfried Méance
- La Voix De Kate Moss, directed by Tatiana-Margaux Bonhomme
- La Mère Morte, directed by Thierry Charrier
- Rétention, directed by Thomas Kruithof
- Le Père Noël Est Mort, directed by Valentin Marro
- Nous Sommes Tous Des Êtres Penchés, directed by Simon Lelouch

La Femis Shorts Selection

- Faux Frères, directed by Lucas Delangle
- Hier J’Étais Deux, directed by Sylvain Coisne
- 3 Secondes Et Demie, directed by Édouard Beaucamp
- Les Filles De La Côte d’Azur, directed by Axel Victor

=== American Shorts Competitive Selection ===
American Shorts Selection

- Pearl Was Here, directed by Kate Marks
- The Captain, directed by Nash Edgerton & Spencer Susser
- Mobile Homes, directed by Vladimir de Fontenay
- Palimpsest, directed by Michael Tyburski
- Cupid, directed by John Dion

Columbia University Film Festival Shorts Selection

- Blackwood, directed by Natasha Johns-Messenger
- Penny Dreadful, directed by Shane Atkinson
- Soul Winner, directed by Jennifer Gerber
- Asternauts, directed by Marta Masferre
- The Dark, directed by Justin P. Lange

USC School of Cinematic Arts Shorts Selection

- Elie’s Overcoat, directed by Erik Howell
- Midnight, directed by Talia Lidia
- Shaya, directed by Amir Noorani
- Tina For President, directed by Carmen Emmi
- Waking Up, directed by Yuta Okamura

American Film Institute Shorts Selection

- 113 Degrees, directed by Sabrina Doyle
- Goldenstate, directed by Moshe Sayada
- Machsom, directed by Joel Novoa
- Splendor, directed by Eric Yandoc

New York University Tisch School of the Arts Shorts Selection

- The Hunter and the Swan..., directed by Emily Carmichael
- Deja vu, directed by Alexis Gambis
- And Winter Slow, directed by Brian Lannin
- Doubles With Slight Pepper, directed by Ian Harnarine

== US in Progress Official Selection ==
- Beneath the Harvest Sky, directed by Gita Pullapilly
- B.F.E., directed by Shawn Telford
- Children, directed by Jaffe Zinn
- Ping Pong Summer, directed by Michael Tully
- I Believe in Unicorns, directed by Leah Meyerhoff
- 1982, directed by Tommy Olivier

== Awards ==
Audience Prizes

- Best American Independent Film: How To Make Money Selling Drugs, directed by Matthew Cooke
- Best American Short Film: Penny Dreadful, directed by Shane Atkinson
- Best French Short Film: Nous Sommes Tous Des Êtres Penchés, directed by Simon Lelouch

US in Progress

- US in Progress Paris Award: 1982, directed by Tommy Olivier

== Festival theaters ==
- Le Balzac
- Gaumont Champs-Elysées
- Le Lincoln
- MK2 Grand Palais
- Publicis Cinéma
- UGC George V
