= How to Make Money Selling Drugs =

- Film poster
- Directed by: Matthew Cooke
- Written by: Matthew Cooke
- Produced by: Bert Marcus; Adrian Grenier
- Cinematography: Matthew Cooke; Amza Moglan
- Edited by: Jeff Cowan; Matthew Cooke
- Music by: Spencer Nezey
- Production companies: Bert Marcus Productions; Reckless Productions
- Distributed by: Tribeca Film
- Release dates: September 7, 2012 (TIFF); June 26, 2013 (New York City)
- Running time: 96 minutes
- Country: United States
- Language: English

How to Make Money Selling Drugs is a documentary film written, directed and narrated by Matthew Cooke and produced by Bert Marcus and Adrian Grenier. The film premiered at the 2012 Toronto International Film Festival and was theatrically released in June 2013.

== Premise ==
The documentary starts out as a mock guide to how to be a successful pusher, explains how drug dealers, smugglers, kingpins and drug lords make money and the risks involved, with the ultimate aim of setting the stage for the real purpose for the film. It then seriously examines what perpetuates the war on drugs and criticizes it, while providing suggestions and opinions from those trying to deal with the problem of drugs from outside of the institutionalized and incentivized war.

== Interviews ==
- Radley Balko
- Bobby Carlton
- Cheye Calvo
- Barry Cooper
- Keith Kruskall
- Neill Franklin
- Joe Gilbride
- Judge James P. Gray
- Woody Harrelson
- John E. Harriel Jr.
- Arianna Huffington
- Curtis "50 Cent" James Jackson III
- Gil Kerlikowske
- Raymond Madden
- Yolanda Madden
- Marshall "Eminem" Bruce Mathers III
- Alexandra Natapoff
- Brian O'Dea
- Patrick Reynalds
- "Freeway" Rick Ross
- Susan Sarandon
- Russell Simmons
- David Simon
- Eric Sterling
- Skipp Townsend
- Howard Wooldridge
- "Mr. X"
- "Pepe"

== Reception ==
Rotten Tomatoes, a review aggregator, reports that 76% of 42 surveyed critics gave the film a positive review; the average rating was 6.6/10. Metacritic rated it 69/100 based on 16 reviews. John Anderson of Variety wrote, "By being both glib and preachy, this highly stylized pic ends up being a tiresome buzzkill". John DeFore of The Hollywood Reporter wrote, "The entertaining doc is more serious than it seems but has little new to say." Nicolas Rapold of The New York Times wrote that "there's a lot to learn" from the film, but it overwhelms viewers with unnecessary flash and "relentless voice-over". Gary Goldstein of the Los Angeles Times wrote that it "begins as a slick, tongue-in-cheek guide to successful dope dealing" but "masterfully evolves into something far more vital, cogent and impressive." Ernest Hard of The Village Voice wrote, "It's a smart, funny, tough-minded film crammed with data and personal anecdotes" that help to illuminate the costs of the drug war. Linda Holmes of NPR wrote, "Whether or not you agree with its underlying critique of existing drug policy, How To Make Money Selling Drugs is an ambitious, creative attempt to talk in a single film about everything from the disparate treatment of black and white dealers to the influence of asset forfeiture on law-enforcement strategies to the devastation of Mexico's drug war." Chris Nashawaty of Entertainment Weekly wrote, "While it won't win any Oscars, Matthew Cooke's new documentary How To Make Money Selling Drugs may take the prize for being the shallowest and most glib film of the year."

The production won the audience prize for best American independent film at the 2013 Champs-Élysées Film Festival.
