= Skipp Townsend =

American former gang member

- Born: Clifford Townsend; 1963 or 1964 (62–63); South Los Angeles, California, U.S.
- Education: Susan Miller Dorsey High School
- Organization: 2nd Call
- Board member of: Southern California Cease Fire Committee
- Allegiance: Bloods (former)

Clifford "Skipp" Townsend (born 1963 or 1964) is an American former gang member from Los Angeles, California. For twenty-seven years, he was a member of the Bloods gang; his first arrest came at age 13. He is the co-founder of 2nd Call and a board member of Southern California Cease Fire Committee.

== Early life ==
Townsend was raised in South Los Angeles. He attended a Catholic elementary school and Susan Miller Dorsey High School, before dropping out in his junior year.

== 2nd Call ==
Townsend is the co-founder and executive director of 2nd Call, a gang intervention non-profit, and board member of the Southern California Cease Fire Committee. He is often interviewed as a pragmatic expert regarding police-public relations and as an "interventionist" regarding community conflicts. Townsend has a reputation for being among the first to arrive at a scene when shots have been fired.

2nd Call was founded in 2005 as a community-based organization designed to save lives by reducing violence and assisting in the personal development of high-risk individuals, proven offenders, ex-felons, parolees, and others with society disregard. The organization provides alternatives to violence and abuse through intervention, counseling and support. It also provides a series of classes aiming to promote positive growth as well as post-release mentorship. 2nd Call provides free quarter-proof classes and trauma classes.

The organization also encourages judges to send individuals to 2nd Call classes rather than to jail, and it offers a pathway to union careers in building trades such as electrical and construction. 2nd Call has helped an estimated 2,000-3,000 individuals.

2nd Call provides classes on domestic violence, parenting, anger management, and re-entry, in Los Angeles and Pasadena. The organization also helps keep at-risk youth out of gangs. Townsend often helps former offenders find jobs in construction or electrical work once they have completed the program.

2nd Call works with activists and acts as a liaison between citizens and law enforcement and pushes for systematic changes in policing.

In 2020, Townsend supported dozens of formerly incarcerated individuals who helped build the SoFi stadium. During the COVID-19 pandemic, the University of Southern California partnered with 2nd Call to help distribute protective supplies for community members, since many could not afford to buy masks.

== Views ==
Townsend supports community policing, law enforcement engaging with their communities more and understand any pain people may be feeling that relates to the involvement of police officers.

== Media appearances ==
Townsend is known for his role in several documentaries and movies: How to Make Money Selling Drugs; "The '80s: The Decade That Made Us, a television mini-series in which he played a former crack dealer; and the Gangland episode "One Blood". He also assisted the casting department in two episodes of T.I.'s Road to Redemption. He has been interviewed in videos posted on YouTube.
