= Michael Van London =

American singer-songwriter

Michal Van London
- Occupation(s): Singer, songwriter

Michael Van London is a singer.

== Career ==
Michael Van London has honed his skills "on both sides of the ocean and in between them" but made his home in Los Angeles where he has fronted his band "The Bombs" (featured on MTV's Paris Hilton My New BBF with the song "Revolution/Revelation) and "The Black Beverly Heels" while constantly recording and releasing material under his own name. His music has been featured on MTV MTV Movie Awards 2011 with his band "The Black Beverly Heels", made officially available in Rock Band( Song : "Dark Beat"- The Black Beverly Heels), and been spotlighted in Spotify's "Artist of the Week" on Fox News Los Angeles. In November 2012 he was also in the running for the Oscars "Best Original Song in a Film" for his work in Chris Colfer’s 2012 debut film Struck By Lightning, where he had a cameo appearance as the janitor. Van London's song ‘"Feel Love," has more drive and punch than many of its competitors. It's a pop-rock tune that's tough instead of sugary.’

In 2006 Van London wrote, sang and produced his debut album "Fortunes of Misfortunes". Van London's second album ‘American Blood and Guts’ was released early 2013.

Van London also performed at the Malibu Music Awards at Pepperdine University's Smothers Theater on October 19, 2013. Where he accepted the award of "Best Alternative Album"
