= Alexandra Natapoff =

American legal scholar

- Occupations: Legal scholar; public defender
- Awards: Guggenheim Fellowship (2016)

Academic background
- Education: Yale University (BA); Stanford Law School (JD)

Academic work
- Sub-discipline: Criminal justice
- Institutions: Loyola Law School; University of California, Irvine School of Law; Harvard Law School

Alexandra Natapoff is an American legal scholar. Originally a federal public defender, she became a law professor at Loyola Law School, University of California, Irvine School of Law, and Harvard Law School, where she is Lee S. Kreindler Professor of Law. A 2016 Guggenheim Fellow, she is author of Snitching (2009) and Punishment Without Crime (2018).

== Biography ==
Natapoff was raised "as a child of Harvard Square ... just ten blocks away from the campus"; her mother was a Harvard University art professor and her father was a Massachusetts Institute of Technology research scientist. She obtained a BA cum laude in philosophy from Yale University and a JD with distinction from Stanford Law School. She was a clerk for district judge Paul L. Friedman (1995-1997) and circuit judge David S. Tatel (1997-1998).

Originally training as a civil rights lawyer, she became a federal public defender in Baltimore after receiving a job offer at a federal office; she served from 2000 to 2003. She became an associate professor at Loyola Law School in 2003, before being promoted to full professor in 2006. She joined the American Law Institute in 2007. In 2017, she moved to University of California, Irvine School of Law where she was appointed Chancellor’s Professor of Law in 2019. She also served as UCI's Center in Law, Society and Culture. In 2020, she moved to Harvard Law School as Lee S. Kreindler Professor of Law.

Natapoff specializes in criminal law. She received an honorable mention for the 2010 American Bar Association Silver Gavel Award for Books for her book Snitching: Criminal Informants and the Erosion of American Justice. In 2016, she was awarded a Guggenheim Fellowship in Law. Her 2018 book Punishment Without Crime addresses the impact of misdemeanor charges in the criminal justice system on inequality. She also co-edited the volumes The New Criminal Justice Thinking (2017) and America Unfinished (2026).

== Works ==
- Snitching: Criminal Informants and the Erosion of American Justice (2009)
- (ed. with Sharon Dolovich) The New Criminal Justice Thinking (2017)
- Punishment Without Crime: How Our Massive Misdemeanor System Traps the Innocent and Makes America More Unequal (2018)
- (ed. with Guy-Uriel Charles) America Unfinished: 250 Years of Law and Governance (2026)
