= Matthew Cooke (filmmaker) =

American filmmaker

- Born: February 28, 1973 (age 53); Washington, D.C.
- Education: Pitzer College (B.A., 1996)
- Occupations: Film producer, film director, screenwriter, film editor
- Spouse: April Bowlby
- Children: 1
- Website: https://www.matthewcooke.com/

Matthew Cooke (born February 28, 1973) is the writer-director of How to Make Money Selling Drugs, a documentary film which criticizes the war on drugs in the United States, and Survivors Guide to Prison, about the prison system. Cooke also often serves as his own narrator, editor, cinematographer and visual effects artist. Cooke was the producer and editor of Amy Berg's Oscar–nominated documentary Deliver Us from Evil, his first feature film, and writer, director, editor and actor on Fuel TV's Stupidface. He produced Adrian Grenier's 2010 HBO documentary Teenage Paparazzo which premiered at the 2010 Sundance Film Festival. Cooke also contributed editing, motion graphics and cinematography work to the picture. He is producing American Race, an upcoming documentary directed by Amy Berg, who Cooke previously worked with on Deliver Us from Evil.

Cooke graduated magna cum laude with a Bachelor of Arts in film from Pitzer College in 1996. He was engaged to actress Maggie Grace from February 2015 to February 2016. Cooke is married to actress April Bowlby.
