= Struck by Lightning (2012 film) =

- Theatrical release poster
- Directed by: Brian Dannelly
- Written by: Chris Colfer
- Produced by: David Permut; Mia Chang; Rob Aguire; Chris Colfer
- Starring: Chris Colfer; Allison Janney; Christina Hendricks; Sarah Hyland; Carter Jenkins; Brad William Henke; Rebel Wilson; Angela Kinsey; Polly Bergen; Dermot Mulroney
- Cinematography: Bobby Bukowski
- Edited by: Tia Nolan
- Music by: Jake Monaco
- Production company: Permut Presentations
- Distributed by: Tribeca Film
- Release dates: 21 April 2012 (Tribeca); 19 December 2012 (VOD); 11 January 2013
- Running time: 90 minutes
- Country: United States
- Language: English
- Budget: $1.3 million
- Box office: $28,378

Struck by Lightning is a 2012 American coming-of-age comedy drama film directed by Brian Dannelly and written by and starring Chris Colfer. The film had its world premiere at the Tribeca Film Festival on 21 April 2012, and was released theatrically on 11 January 2013. It features the final screen appearance of actress Polly Bergen.

On 20 November 2012, Colfer released a young adult novel based on the film, titled Struck by Lightning: The Carson Phillips Journal.

The film received mixed reviews with criticism going to the character of Carson, but praise for Colfer's screenplay and the performances of the cast.

== Plot ==
High school senior Carson Phillips is struck dead by lightning. The film is a flashback of his last months. He plans to go to Northwestern University to become an editor for The New Yorker, but has not made his dreams happen.

During a writer's club meeting, Malerie Baggs asks Carson for advice about her writing. He says she cannot find the ideas, the ideas have to find her. He goes to a student council meeting run by head cheerleader Claire Matthews, where everyone ignores him because of his criticism. As Carson's mother Sheryl is picking up prescriptions, she chats with the new pharmacist April Adams, who is pregnant and Carson's future step mother. Carson also visits his grandmother, but she does not recognize him due to Alzheimer's.

As Carson is finishing up the school paper at night, he catches wealthy student Nicholas Forbes and the drama club president Scott Thomas kissing. Nicholas begs him to not out him. Carson agrees provided they contribute to the paper until graduation.

Carson's father Neal and April visit a lawyer to straighten out legal issues. April, unaware of Carson or Sheryl, storms out when she learns Neal is still legally married and has a child.

Carson's guidance counselor suggests he improve his chances of getting into Northwestern by submitting to a literary magazine. He gets permission to start one from the principal. Announcing at school assembly that all entries will be taken, Carson later finds the submission box filled with nothing useful. When Malerie believes others will join as Carson got Scott and Nicholas to write for the school paper, he tells her about the blackmail. She reveals that she caught Claire having sex with Coach Walker, her boyfriend's brother. Malerie suspects everyone in their school probably has an embarrassing secret that they would not want exposed.

Sheryl meets April filling a prescription. April recognizes Carson's name on the anti-depressant prescription. She goes home to Neal and demands to meet his son. The writer's club float has to be removed from the homecoming parade, after the cheerleaders take their assigned car. Feeling humiliated, Carson and Malerie blackmail several of their peers into writing for the literary magazine: school paper members, the yearbook president, Vicki, and faux foreign exchange student, Emilio.

During a meeting with the other students and Coach Walker, Carson extorts agreements that everyone must offer something to put in the magazine to keep their secrets safe. Carson has Claire and Coach Walker get each cheerleader and football player to submit something, to make the issue more popular among the student body.

After school, Neal calls Carson, telling him about April and the baby and invites him to dinner. Over the meal, Carson lets her realise his father is concealing his abandonment, which leads to an argument. At a student council meeting with the principal, Carson's outburst against a clothing logo ban leads to withdrawal of all students' off-campus privileges.

During another encounter, Sheryl tells April that she gave Neal everything, and was left with nothing. She says that she was just like April and had a child to keep him, but it did not work. Carson completes the literary magazine, but it fails. Although he was accepted into Northwestern, as he never confirmed his admission he lost his spot. Carson assumes his letter was lost in the mail, but Sheryl admits she threw his acceptance letter away to protect him as his dreams will never come true.

While Carson and Malerie pack up the unread literary magazines, he asks her why she films everything. She explains she believes the present is the most important, not the past. As Malerie is leaving, she asks Carson if they are friends. He says they are best friends. Carson writes his own story, explaining how he realized, despite everything he went through, he did get other students to write for the literary magazine. Now truly happy he leaves, going outside as thunder starts.

Carson's body is not found for three days. At the funeral many, including the principal and the students who hated him, show Carson left an impression on everyone he knew. Malerie takes over as president of the writers' club, while Sheryl visits her mother in assisted care.

== Cast ==
- Chris Colfer as Carson Phillips, the head of the school's writing club. He is handsome, intelligent and ambitious but disliked, belittled and insulted by his peers, mostly for his sarcastic and dry personality that he gained after his parents' divorce.
  - Adam Kolkin as Young Carson Phillips
- Allison Janney as Sheryl Phillips, Carson's alcoholic and pill-popping single mother.
- Christina Hendricks as April, Carson's father's pregnant fiancée.
- Sarah Hyland as Claire Mathews, the head cheerleader and class president.
- Carter Jenkins as Nicholas Forbes, a wealthy, closeted gay student.
- Brad William Henke as Principal Gifford, the school principal.
- Rebel Wilson as Malerie Baggs, Carson's best friend.
- Angela Kinsey as Ms. Sharpton, the guidance counselor.
- Polly Bergen as Grandma, Carson's grandmother who's suffering from Alzheimer's disease.
- Dermot Mulroney as Neal Phillips, Carson's absent father.
- Allie Grant as Remy Baker, the editor of the school yearbook.
- Ashley Rickards as Vicki Jordan, an apathetic goth girl.
- Robbie Amell as Justin Walker, the captain of the football team.
- Charlie Finn as Coach Colin Walker, the football coach and Justin's brother.
- Roberto Aguire as Emilio Lopez
- Matt Prokop as Dwayne Michaels
- Graham Rogers as Scott Thomas, the drama club president.
- Michael Van London as Caretaker (uncredited)
  He also wrote and sang three songs in the film: "Sound of an Amp", "Downtown" and "Feel Love" © Michael Van London Recordings ASCAP

== Release ==
The film had its world premiere at the 2012 Tribeca Film Festival on 21 April 2012. The film was released on VOD prior to its theatrical release on 11 January 2013. It was released on DVD and Blu-ray on 21 May 2013.

== Critical reception ==
Struck by Lightning received mixed reviews, holding a Metacritic score of 41, and a Rotten Tomatoes score of 33%. The most common complaint from reviewers was that Colfer's character came off as too arrogant and cynical, and didn't manage to be likeable. Many reviews agreed that the dialogue was witty and funny and that the cast gave strong performances. Many critics also praised Colfer's debut as a screenwriter.

Lisa Schwarzbaum of Entertainment Weekly gave the movie a B−, writing, "After his lofty aspirations to write for The New Yorker are cut painlessly and semi-amusingly short by a freak encounter with lightning, Carson looks back on his so-called life with the gently rueful wisdom that is frequently granted young dead people in flashback tales like this one. The message? Seize the day, kids. There are some real stresses in the fellow's life, many caused by his mess of a drunken single mom (an affecting Allison Janney)."
