= List of Adventures of Superman episodes =

Series intertitles in black and white (1952–54) and color (1955–58)

This is a list of Adventures of Superman episodes.

The first two seasons, comprising 52 episodes and half of the series' whole, were filmed in black and white. In 1954, series producer Whitney Ellsworth insisted on filming in color, as some home viewers were beginning to purchase color television sets. However, these episodes were still transmitted in black and white. Also beginning with season three, the series began to take on the lighthearted, whimsical tone of the Superman comic books of the 1950s. The villains were often caricatured, Runyonesque gangsters played with tongue in cheek. Violence on the show was toned down further. The only gunfire that occurred was aimed at Superman, and of course the bullets bounced off. Superman was less likely to engage in fisticuffs with the villains. On occasions when Superman did use physical force, he would take crooks out in a single karate-style chop or, if he happened to have two criminals in hand, banging their heads together. More often than not, the villains were likely to knock themselves out fleeing Superman. By then very popular to viewers, Jimmy Olsen was now being played as the show's comic foil to Superman. Many of the plots featured him and Lois Lane being captured, only to be rescued at the last minute by Superman.

Scripts for the last season did not always hit the campy lows of the previous two years and reestablished a bit of the seriousness of the show, often with science fiction elements such as a Kryptonite-powered robot (a left-over prop from "The Bowery Boys Meet the Monsters"), atomic explosions, and impregnable metal cubes. In one of the last episodes, "The Perils of Superman" (a takeoff on The Perils of Pauline), there was indeed deadly peril straight out of the movie serials: Lois gagged and tied to a set of railroad tracks with a speeding train bearing down on her, Perry White nearly sawed in half while tied to a log, Jimmy in a runaway car headed for a cliff, and Clark Kent immersed in a vat of acid. This was one of three episodes directed by George Reeves himself in an attempt to inject some new life into the series. Noel Neill's hair was dyed a bright red for this season, though the color change was not apparent in the initial black-and-white broadcasts. Although Reeves's efforts did not save the series from cancellation, "The Perils of Superman" is regarded by some as one of the best episodes. The numbering scheme in the following list is derived from the purely consecutive numbering used in Superman: Serial to Cereal.

== Series overview ==
All six seasons of this series have been released on four DVD box sets by Warner Bros. Home Video.

Season	Episodes	Originally released	
Season	Episodes	First released	Last released
1	26	September 19, 1952	August 10, 1953
2	26	September 18, 1953	March 13, 1954
3	13	April 23, 1955	October 15, 1955
4	13	February 18, 1956	June 16, 1956
5	13	March 8, 1957	May 31, 1957
6	13	February 3, 1958	April 28, 1958

== Episodes ==
The following list of episodes is compiled from the websites IMDb.com (Internet Movie Database), Supermanhomepage.com, Answers.com, and Fandango.com.

=== Season 1 (1952–53) ===
No. overall	No. in season	Title	Directed by	Written by	Original release date
1	1	"Superman on Earth"	Tommy Carr	Richard Fielding	September 19, 1952
Jor-El, Krypton's leading scientist, sends his infant son to Earth in a rocket just as the planet explodes. The rocket is found by Eben and Sarah Kent, and Eben gets the infant out before the craft explodes. They raise the child as their own. Years later, after Eben's death and now aware of his superpowers, Clark Kent moves to Metropolis. Sarah has made a costume for him, and she tells him that he must use his powers for good. Superman makes his debut saving a man falling from a blimp (similar to the Akron incident of 1932). As Clark, he hustles the man to the Daily Planet, which scores a scoop for the paper and a job for Kent. The Daily Planet named the superhero Superman. Guest Stars: Ross Elliott (listed in credits but does not appear in this episode), Herbert Rawlinson as Rozan (white-bearded president of Krypton Council), Stuart Randall as Gogan (member of Krypton Council), Aline Towne as Lara, Frances Morris as Sarah Ma Kent, Dani Nolan as Perry White's receptionist. Uncredited (in order of appearance): Robert Rockwell as Jor-El, Wheaton Chambers as Krypton Council Member, Stuart Holmes as Krypton Council member, Tom Fadden as Eben Pa Kent, Jeff Silver (some sources say Joel Nestler) as young Clark Kent, Sam Flint as Pa Kent's doctor, Dabbs Greer as man who hangs by rope from dirigible.
2	2	"The Haunted Lighthouse"	Tommy Carr	Eugene Solow	September 26, 1952
While visiting his aunt and cousin on Moose Island, Maine, Jimmy is alarmed by their suspicious behavior. After being warned to stay away from a lighthouse that is said to be haunted, he calls Clark for help in his investigation. Guest Stars: Maude Prickett as voice of parrot, Jimmy Ogg as Chris, Allene Roberts as Alice, Sarah Padden as Aunt Louisa impostor / Mrs. Carmody. Uncredited: William Challee as Mack, Effie Laird as the real Aunt Louisa. Note: Phyllis Coates and John Hamilton are credited but do not appear in this episode.
3	3	"The Case of the Talkative Dummy"	Tommy Carr	Dennis Cooper and Lee Backman	October 3, 1952
Clark, Lois, and Jimmy attend a ventriloquist act that goes wrong when the dummy appears to talk by itself. Upon further investigation, they link what the dummy appears to have said to a series of armored car hijackings. In this episode Jimmy reveals his full name as James Bartholomew Olsen. Guest Stars: Robert Shayne as Inspector Henderson, Tris Coffin as E.J. Davis / Al Roselli, Sid Saylor as Marco, Pierre Watkins as Harry Green, Robert Kent as safe mover, Phil Pine as usher.. Uncredited: Bert L. Stevens as worker at newspaper office. Note: Pierre Watkin (credited in this episode as Pierre Watkins) portrayed Perry White in the 1948 film serial Superman and the 1950 film serial Atom Man vs. Superman.
4	4	"Mystery of the Broken Statues"	Tommy Carr	William C. Joyce	October 10, 1952
A notorious con artist and his thugs are going to all the antique shops in town, buying cheap figurines and smashing them. Clark and Lois assume that they are looking for something hidden inside the figurines, so they investigate. Guest Stars: Robert Shayne as Inspector Henderson, Tris Coffin as Paul Marden, Michael Vallon as Mr. Bonelli, Maurice Cass as Ellie's Gift Shop owner, Phillip Pine as Marden's compatriot Dorn. Uncredited: Wade Crosby as Marden's henchman Pete. Note: Jack Larson and John Hamilton are credited but do not appear in this episode.
5	5	"The Monkey Mystery"	Tommy Carr	Ben Peter Freeman and Doris Gilbert	October 17, 1952
"CENTRAL EUROPE 1951" The daughter of an Eastern European scientist flees to the United States to give a secret formula to the president before the communists who killed her father can get to it, and Lois receives information on her whereabouts from an organ grinder and his monkey. Guest Stars: Allene Roberts as Maria Moleska, Michael Vallon as Tony Urmenti, Harry Lewis as Harold Crane, Bill Challee as Max. Uncredited (in order of appearance): Fred Essler as scientist Jan Moleska, Jack Perrin as man who watches monkey act.
6	6	"Night of Terror"	Lee Sholem	Ben Peter Freeman	October 24, 1952
While on vacation, Lois stumbles upon a ring of criminals who are smuggling fugitives into Canada. She and the innkeeper's wife are captured, and it is up to Jimmy and Superman to save them. Guest Stars: Paul Bryar as Manager, Frank Richards as Solly, Joel Friedkin as Oscar (uncredited), Steve Carr as Mr. Quinn (uncredited), Almira Sessions as Miss Bacharach, John Kellogg as Mitch, Richard Benedict as Baby Face Stevens, Ann Doran as Mrs. King. Uncredited: Saul Gorss stunt double for George Reeves in fistfight scene. Note: As discussed in Serial to Cereal (p.73 and 78), Lois and Solly scuffled early in the episode. Coates and Richards were standing too close together, and Richards accidentally knocked Coates out with a punch.
7	7	"The Birthday Letter"	Lee Sholem	Dennis Cooper	October 31, 1952
A crippled young girl writes Superman a letter asking him to take her to the fair for her birthday, but before he arrives she is kidnapped by a group of counterfeiters who need information that she has been given by mistake. Guest Stars: Isa Ashdown as Kathy Williams, Louis Mercier as LaRue, Nan Boardman as Marie, Paul Marion as Cusak, Jack Daly as Perkins, John Doucette as Slugger, Virginia Carroll as Mrs. Williams, Maurice Marsac as Marcel Duval.
8	8	"The Mind Machine"	Lee Sholem	Dennis Cooper, Lee Backman	November 7, 1952
A mobster kidnaps a scientist and takes possession of his invention. The crook uses the device to damage the minds of people testifying before an investigative committee. The victims die a short time later. Superman races to find the mobster before Lois Lane testifies before the committee. Guest Stars: Griff Barnett as Dr. Stanton, Harry Hayden as Wagner, Harold Kruger as Al (uncredited), Steve Carr as Dr. Hadley (uncredited), Lester Dorr as Bus Driver, James Seay as Senator Taylor, Ben Welden as Curley, Dan Seymour as Cranek. Uncredited: Carey Loftin (flying) and Dale Van Sickel (fistfight) stunt doubles for George Reeves, including Van Sickel ducking when Cranek throws an emptied gun at Superman.
9	9	"Rescue"	Thomas Carr	Monroe Manning	November 14, 1952
While Lois is in Carbide, Pennsylvania gathering information for a story about the town's mining system an old prospector becomes trapped in a cave in. Lois attempts to rescue him, but when she is trapped in the mine with him it is up to Superman to save them both. Guest Stars: Houseley Stevenson as Pop, Ed Cobb as Lafe Reiser, Milt Kibbee as Harry, Fred Sherman as D.K. Sims, Ray Bennett as Stan.
10	10	"The Secret of Superman"	Thomas Carr	Wells Root	November 21, 1952
Unscrupulous Dr. H.L. Orth is using an advanced version of a truth serum to hypnotize employees of the Daily Planet in an attempt to discover Superman's secret identity. Guest Stars: Helen Wallace as Mrs. Olsen (Jimmy's Mother), Walter McGrail as Newsman (uncredited), Joel Friedkin as Herman, Steve Carr as Cook (uncredited), Larry J. Blake as Henchman, Peter Brocco as Dr. orth.
11	11	"No Holds Barred"	Lee Sholem	Peter Dixon	November 28, 1952
Bad Luck Brannigan, a wrestler working for a crooked promoter, uses "the paralyzer" to cripple opponents. Clark Kent discovers the promoter has imprisoned an immigrant dubbed "the swami" who has extensive knowledge of the body's pressure points. In his Superman identity, Clark sees the immigrant. "The swami" instructs Superman in his techniques. As Clark, he then teaches a college wrestler – who has publicly challenged Brannigan – how to counter "the paralyzer". Guest Stars: Dick Reeves as Bad Luck Brannigan, Tito Renaldo as Ramm, Malcolm Mealey as Wayne, Henry Kulky (a former wrestler in real life) as Crusher (uncredited), Dick Elliott as Sam Bleaker, Karl Davis (another wrestler in real life) as Adonis (uncredited), Herb Vigran as Murray, Bill Kennedy as TV announcer (uncredited). Uncredited, unidentified stunt man for George Reeves during fistfight.
12	12	"The Deserted Village"	Thomas Carr	Ben Peter Freeman; Dick Hamilton	December 5, 1952
When Lois has trouble getting her nurse on the telephone, she and Clark drive to the small town of Cliffton to see what the problem is. After arriving, they find that the town is mostly deserted, and the few remaining townspeople don't seem to want them to know what is going on. Guest Stars: Ann Tyrrell as Miss Walton, Ed Cobb as Peter Godfrey, Malcolm Mealey as Alvin Godfrey, Fred Sherman as Dr. Jessup, Maudie Prickett as Matilda Taisey.
13	13	"The Stolen Costume"	Lee Sholem	Ben Peter Freeman	December 12, 1952
A criminal breaks into Clark Kent's apartment, finds a hidden closet, and steals Clark's Superman costume. The criminal is fatally wounded, but not before he takes the costume to hood Ace and his girlfriend Connie. Clark is desperate to find the missing costume. Ace and Connie die with the secret when they attempt to escape the precarious clifftop cabin Superman imprisons them in. Guest Stars: Dan Seymour as Ace, Frank Jenks as Candy, Veda Ann Borg as Connie, Bob Williams as Policeman, Norman Budd as Johnny Sims.
14	14	"Mystery in Wax"	Lee Sholem	Ben Peter Freeman	December 19, 1952
Madam Selena Dawn and her husband own a wax museum in Metropolis. She claims to have visions that prominent people will die within six months. Indeed, the people appear to commit suicide. Madam Dawn's latest vision is that Perry White will die. Guest Stars: Steve Carr as Dr. John Hurley (uncredited), Lester Sharpe as Andrew, Mira McKinney as Madame Selena.
15	15	"Treasure of the Incas"	Thomas Carr	Howard J. Green	December 26, 1952
While Lois is on her way to an auction featuring South American items, a man asks her to purchase an Inca tapestry for him. Soon after, the man is killed and the tapestry is stolen from Lois, so she, Jimmy, and Clark follow the murderer to Lima to find the tapestry and catch the criminals behind the murder. Guest Stars: Hal Gerard as Professor Laverra, Juan Duval as Dr. Cuesta, Steve Carr as Anselmo (uncredited), Julian Rivero as Taxi Driver, Leonard Penn as Mendoza, Martin Garralaga as Chief of Police.
16	16	"Double Trouble"	Thomas Carr	Eugene Solow	January 2, 1953
A man aboard a ship to Metropolis is smuggling something valuable into the country, but when one of his partner's henchmen shows up to help him get the item through customs, the passenger kills the other man. The passenger then dresses up as a woman, and, in an attempt to give his partner the slip, he gives Jimmy, who is at the dock to interview an actress, an empty box and tells him to give it to the men who are waiting for him. When Jimmy is kidnapped by the men, Superman must save him, but in order to do that he first must figure out why he was kidnapped. Guest Stars: John Baer as Kreuger (uncredited), Howland Chamberlin as Dr. Fischer/Schumann, Richard Powers as Major Lee, Rudolph Anders as Dr. Albrecht, Steve Carr as Otto Von Klaben/Madame Charpentier (uncredited), Ross Ford as Heavy, Selmer Jackson as Colonel Redding, Jimmie Dodd as Jake (uncredited), John Crawford as Ambulance Driver (uncredited).
17	17	"The Runaway Robot"	Thomas Carr	Dick Hamilton	January 9, 1953
Prof. Horatio Hinkle (Lucien Littlefield) is the inventor of a robot. He is kidnapped by burglars who intend to use his robot for robberies. The police set out to arrest Hinkle for a series of crimes. Hinkle telephones his assistant Marvin (Bob Easton) to alert Lois Lane and Superman. Guest Stars: Dan Seymour as Rocko, Russell Johnson as Chopper, John Harmon as Mousie.
18	18	"Drums of Death"	Lee Sholem	Dick Hamilton	January 16, 1953
Jimmy Olsen and Perry White's sister Kate (Mabel Albertson) go missing in Haiti while filming voodoo practitioners. The character of Kate White was created as a fill-in for Lois Lane (Phyllis Coates who was appearing in other projects). Perry and Clark travel to Haiti and find Kate and Jimmy being held hostage by the voodoo cult they were filming. Guest Stars: Mr. Barbarier (Milton Wood), Voodoo Drummer (uncredited) (Smoki Whitfield), Dr. Jerrod (George Hamilton), Leland Masters (Leonard Mudie), William Johnson (Henry Corden in blackface).
19	19	"The Evil Three"	Thomas Carr	Ben Peter Freeman	January 23, 1953
Perry White and Jimmy Olsen, while on a fishing trip, end up staying at a rundown hotel. It has only three occupants: two men who are trying to kill each other and an old woman who laughs like a maniac. Superman races to help his friends before they fall victim to the "evil three". Guest Stars: Rhys Williams as Macey Taylor, Cecil Elliott as Elsa, Jonathan Hale as Col. Brand.
20	20	"Riddle of the Chinese Jade"	Thomas Carr	Ben Peter Freeman, Whitney Ellsworth, Robert Maxwell	January 30, 1953
Harry Wong, manager of Lu Sung's antique store, decides to help thief John Greer steal a priceless Guanyin jade statue from Sung. Although no one is supposed to get hurt, the plan changes when Sung's niece Lily witnesses the robbery and is kidnapped by Greer. Superman, who as Clark Kent is interviewing Sung for the scoop on his donating the statue to a museum, must solve the crime. Guest Stars: Victor Sen Yung as Harry Wong was the only Asian actor. Paul E. Burns as Lu Sung, and Gloria Saunders as Lilly, were non-Asians who had their eyes taped with an upward slant to look Asian. James Craven as John Greer.
21	21	"The Human Bomb"	Lee Sholem	Richard Fielding (Whitney Ellsworth, Robert Maxwell)	February 6, 1953
"Bet-a-Million" Butler, who will "bet on anything", wagers $100,000 he can keep Superman under his control for 30 minutes. He shows up at the Daily Planet and abducts Lois Lane, forcing her onto the ledge of the newspaper's office building. Butler, calling himself only the "human bomb", has strapped dynamite to himself. After Superman arrives, the "human bomb" says he'll detonate the explosive unless Superman agrees to stay put for 30 minutes while a robbery takes place. Superman agrees but has no intention of allowing the robbery to take place. Guest Stars: Almira Sessions as Receptionist (uncredited), Trevor Bardette as Bet-a-Million Butler, Lou Lubin as Small Henchman, Steve Carr as Sam (uncredited), Ted Ryan as Large Henchman, Aline Towne as Receptionist (uncredited), Dennis Moore as Officer Riley, Marshall Reed as Inspector Hill, Lou Krugman as Conway (uncredited).
22	22	"Czar of the Underworld"	Thomas Carr	Eugene Solow	February 13, 1953
A movie is being filmed about mobster Luigi Dinelli. The film is based on a series of articles that Clark Kent wrote for the Daily Planet. Dinelli is more than displeased. He orders a hit on Clark before the reporter and Inspector Henderson can leave for Hollywood to observe filming. Later, an actor on the movie is killed when real ammunition has been substituted for blanks. Clark, in both his civilian and Superman identities, works to put Dinelli away for good. Guest Stars: Steve Carr as Director (uncredited), Joe Kirk as Gangster with Binoculars (uncredited), Roy Gordon as Postello, Tony Caruso as Luigi Dinelli, Paul Fix as Ollie, John Maxwell as Guard.
23	23	"Ghost Wolf"	Lee Sholem	Dick Hamilton	February 20, 1953
The Lone Pine Timber Company, which is owned by the Daily Planet and supplies it with the pulp wood to make its paper, is in danger of shutting down after a series of mishaps. When the last of its employees is scared off because of evidence of a werewolf on the premises, Perry White sends Clark, Jimmy, and Lois to investigate. Guest Stars: Stanley Andrews as Sam Garvin, Jane Adams as Babette DuLoque, Harold Goodwin as Worker, Lou Krugman as Jacques Olivier.
24	24	"Crime Wave"	Thomas Carr	Ben Peter Freeman	February 27, 1953
As a massive crime wave unfolds, Superman vows to put top mobsters behind bars. His ultimate target is the mysterious "No. 1 man". The top criminal devises a powerful electrical trap for the Man of Steel. Guest Stars: John Eldredge as Walter Canby, Barbra Fuller as Sally, Bobby Barber as Tony, Al Eben as "Big Ed" Bullock, Phil Van Zandt as Nick Marone, Joe Mell as Professor, Bill Kennedy as Radio announcer (uncredited). This marks Phyllis Coates' final appearance proper on the series as Lois Lane (not counting her archive appearances in the two-part season finale).
25	25	"The Unknown People" – Part 1	Lee Sholem	Richard Fielding (Robert Maxwell)	August 10, 1953
Clark Kent and Lois Lane travel to Silsby, Texas, site of the deepest well ever drilled. When they arrive, the well is being shut down and the oil company manager present isn't saying why. Meanwhile, two short beings with large heads and furry hands come up from the well to explore. Luke Benson leads a mob of townspeople wanting to kill the "unknown people". Despite Superman's efforts to calm things down, the mob has tracked the two creatures to the top of a dam, trying to kill them. What the mob doesn't know is the creatures cause things they touch to glow in the dark. Guest Stars: Hal K. Dawson as Chuck Weber (uncredited), Harry Harvey as Doc Saunders (uncredited), Beverly Washburn as Little Girl (uncredited), John T. Bambury as Mole Man (uncredited), Tony Boris as Mole Man (uncredited), Margia Dean as Mother (uncredited), Irene Martin as Mrs. Pomfrey (uncredited), Walter Reed as Bill Corrigan, J. Farrell MacDonald as Pop Shannon, Steve Carr as Eddie (uncredited), Billy Curtis as Mole Man (uncredited), Jeff Corey as Luke Benson, Jerry Maren as Mole Man (uncredited), Byron Foulger as Jeff Regan (uncredited), Ray Walker as John Craig (uncredited), Stanley Andrews as Sheriff (uncredited), John Phillips as Matt (uncredited). Note: This episode (and the one following it) are the only hour-long/two part episode in the series. It was originally presented in theaters as Superman and the Mole Men, which featured Phyllis Coates' in her first appearance as Lois Lane. On TV however it is usually broadcast as the finale of Season One, thus marking Coates' final appearance in the series.
26	26	"The Unknown People" – Part 2	Lee Sholem	Richard Fielding (Robert Maxwell)	August 10, 1953
One of the "unknown people" is shot while atop a dam near Silsby, Texas. Superman catches him before he falls into the water and takes him to the Silsby hospital. Superman, in his Clark Kent identity, assists a doctor who operates on the creature. The doctor discovers his patient has all the organs and internal body structure of humans. Meanwhile, the Luke Benson-led mob tries to kill the other visitor from the center of the Earth. That creature escapes, later bringing up more of his people along with a weapon. Superman races to defuse an explosive situation. Guest Stars: Billy Curtis as Mole Man (uncredited), Ray Walker as John Craig (uncredited), John Phillips as Matt (uncredited), Steve Carr as Eddie (uncredited), Tony Boris as Mole Man (uncredited), John T. Bambury as Mole Man (uncredited), Jerry Maren as Mole Man (uncredited), Jeff Corey as Luke Benson, Walter Reed as Bill Corrigan, J. Farrell MacDonald as Pop Shannon, Frank Reicher as Hospital Administrator (uncredited), Phil Warren as Deputy Jim (uncredited), Hal K. Dawson as Chuck Weber (uncredited), Adrienne Marden as Nurse (uncredited), John Baer as Doctor Reed (uncredited), Stanley Andrews as Sheriff (uncredited). Note: Second part of the previous episode that was originally presented in theaters as Superman and the Mole Men.

=== Season 2 (1953–54) ===
No. overall	No. in season	Title	Directed by	Written by	Original release date
27	1	"Five Minutes to Doom"	Thomas Carr	Monroe Manning	September 18, 1953
Clark Kent and Lois Lane interview Joe Winters, a man on death row. As Clark listens to Winter's story, he checks the convict's pulse. It remains steady and Clark is convinced Winters is innocent. Clark's suspicions are confirmed when he and Lois pick up a hitchhiker on their way back to Metropolis and the hitchhiker leaves a bomb meant for the reporters. The Daily Planet reporters search for a way to clear Winters. They obtain key evidence but a violent electrical storm has knocked out telephone service between Metropolis and the state capital. Guest Stars: Dabbs Greer as Joe Winters, Kim Charney as Billy Winters (uncredited), Sam Flint as The Warden, Lewis Russell as Mr. Wayne, William Green as Governor, Dale Van Sickel as Baker, Jean Willes as Secretary, Lois Hall as Mrs. Winters, John Kellogg as Turk. Notes: This marks Noel Neill's first appearance on the series as Lois Lane. Previously, Neill portrayed Lois in the 1948 film serial Superman and the 1950 film serial Atom Man vs. Superman.; Dale Van Sickel had been an occasional stunt double for George Reeves in Season 1.
28	2	"The Big Squeeze"	Thomas Carr	David Chantler	September 25, 1953
The Daily Planet plans to give Dan Grayson an award for being citizen of the year. Grayson is a dedicated family man, active in community groups and a loyal employee of a fur company. He is also a former convict, something he's managed to keep hidden in his new life. That all changes when a criminal from Grayson's past blackmails him, wanting Grayson's help on a robbery of the fur company. Unwittingly, Grayson has already provided one boost. Grayson accidentally locked himself in the fur company's vault, which requires Superman to get him out. Guest Stars: Reed Howes as Police Officer, Harry Cheshire as Mr. Foster, Bradley Mora as Tim Grayson, Ted Ryan as Al, Hugh Beaumont (later the dad of Leave It To Beaver) as Dan Grayson, Aline Towne as Peggy Grayson, John Kellogg as Luke Maynard.
29	3	"The Man Who Could Read Minds"	Thomas Carr	Roy Hamilton	October 3, 1953
Reporters Lois (Noel Neill) and Jimmy (Jack Larson) hope to find out who has been pulling a series of burglaries. Swami Armada (Larry Dobkin), a self-styled mind reader, is getting imprints of keys allowing his confederates to break into residences. Their sleuthing leads Lois and Jimmy right into the clutches of the villains (Richard Karlan and Veola Vonn), and it is up to Superman (George Reeves) to rescue the roving reporters once again. Guest Stars: Russell Custer as Sergeant, Tom Bernard as Doug, Veola Vonn as Laura, Larry Dobkin as Swami, Richard Karlan as Monk.
30	4	"Jet Ace"	Thomas Carr	David Chantler	October 10, 1953
Familiar B-western actor Lane Bradford appears in this episode as intrepid test pilot Chris White (Perry White's nephew). While recovering from injuries incurred in a recent crackup, White falls into the hands of enemy agents determined to pry loose some top-secret information. Guest Stars: Selmer Jackson as General Summers, Jim Hayward as Tim Mallory, Larry Blake as Martin, Ric Roman as Nick, Lane Bradford as Chris White, Dick Reeves as Frenchy.
31	5	"Shot in the Dark"	George Blair	David Chantler	October 17, 1953
A frantic woman named Harriet Hopper (Vera Marshe) bursts into the offices of the Daily Planet, demanding to speak to Superman and makes a beeline to the office of Clark Kent (George Reeves). Harriet stumbles onto Clark's secret identity; her nephew Alan (Billy Gray) has a camera bug and has managed to snap an infrared photo of Clark changing into his Superman outfit. Though Kent manages to finesse his way out of this sticky situation, young Alan is not yet out of the woods: he has also taken a picture of a dangerous criminal named Burnside (John Eldredge) faking his own death in order to defraud an insurance company. Guest Stars: Vera Marshe as Harriet Harper, Billy Gray as Alan, Alan Lee as Bill, Frank Richards as Hank, John Eldredge as Burt "Tulip Man" Burnside.
32	6	"The Defeat of Superman"	George Blair	Jackson Gillis	October 24, 1953
Criminal Happy King returns to Metropolis, determined to rid himself of Superman. He has hired a European scientist, who has found a way to manufacture synthetic Kryptonite from a fragment of the substance. In their first test, Superman feels a sting from a bullet with a small fragment of Kryptonite. Now, the scientist has made a bar made of Kryptonite and Happy King sets a trap. Guest Stars: Sid Tomack as Ruffles, Maurice Cass as Meldini, Peter Mamakos as Happy King.
33	7	"Superman in Exile"	Thomas Carr	Jackson Gillis	October 31, 1953
Superman narrowly prevents disaster at an atomic facility. In doing so, he has become totally irradiated and will kill living things just by being close to them. This forces Superman into exile while the atomic scientists try to figure out what to do. Meanwhile, criminals kidnap Lois Lane, figuring Superman wouldn't dare try to apprehend them because of his condition. Guest Stars: Sam Balter of UCLA play by play broadcasting fame as Radio Announcer, Bob Carson as Allen, Don Dillaway as Fred Harris, Leon Askin as Josef Ferdinand, Joe Forte as Professor Adams, Philip Van Zandt as Regan, Gregg Barton as Sheriff, John Harmon as Skinny.
34	8	"A Ghost for Scotland Yard"	George Blair	Jackson Gillis	November 7, 1953
Brockhurst, a famous magician, has been dead for a number of years, but his ghost is supposed to be returning. Clark Kent, while in England on assignment for the Daily Planet with Jimmy Olsen, is a skeptic. Sir Arthur MacCready, an old friend of Perry White's, is involved and Clark and Jimmy are assigned to stay over and work up a story about Brockhurst's supposed return. As Superman, Clark narrowly saves Sir Arthur's life after he has fainted while driving. It turns out he has seen a giant image of Brockhurst's face in the sky. Guest Stars: Colin Campbell as Sir Arthur MacCready, Clyde Cook as News Vendor, Patrick Aherne as Inspector Farrington, Evelyn Halpern as Betty, Leonard Mudie as Brockhurst, Norma Varden as Mabel MacCready.
35	9	"The Dog Who Knew Superman"	Thomas Carr	David Chantler	November 14, 1953
Superman saves a dog, Corky, from a well. The dog belongs to the wife of Hank, who runs a numbers syndicate in Metropolis. Corky finds Clark Kent, knowing the reporter is Superman. Eventually, Hank realizes Corky knows Superman's civilian identity and intends to use the dog to find it out. Guest Stars: Dona Drake as Joyce, Lester Dorr as Man at Well, Billy Nelson as Louie, John Daly as Dog Catcher, Ben Welden as Hank.
36	10	"The Face and the Voice"	George Blair	Jackson Gillis	November 21, 1953
Boulder, a thug, is recruited to participate in a scheme. Boulder undergoes plastic surgery to look like Superman and then is trained by a voice coach to sound like him. Wearing a Superman costume with a bullet-proof vest underneath, he intimidates merchants and others into giving up money. Yet, Boulder's boss has the bogus Superman donate the stolen money to charity. All of this causes great concern to Clark Kent, who is unsure whether he might be sleepwalking or not. Clark gets reassurance when he finds out the phony Superman makes an appearance. Guest Stars: George Reeves in a dual role as Boulder, Carleton Young as Mr. Fairchild, George Chandler as Scratchy, Percy Helton as Hamlet, Hayden Rorke as Tom (uncredited), I. Stanford Jolley as Plastic Surgeon (uncredited), Nolan Leary as Jewelry Store Watchman, William Newell as Grocery Store Clerk, Sam Balter as Radio Announcer (uncredited).
37	11	"The Man in the Lead Mask"	George Blair	Roy Hamilton	November 28, 1953
Marty Mitchell, a wanted criminal, offers other crooks something they can't pass up: for $50,000 each, they'll get a new face, courtesy of plastic surgery, and changed fingerprints. Experts say changing fingerprints is impossible but Mitchell appears to have done it. Clark Kent, in both in his civilian and Superman identities, is determined to solve the mystery. Guest Stars: John Crawford as Morrell, John Merton as Doc, Joey Ray as Marty Mitchell, Louis Jean Heydt as Pawley, Lyn Thomas as Waitress (as Lynn Thomas), Frank Scannell as Canfield, Paul Bryar as Scotty.
38	12	"Panic in the Sky"	Thomas Carr	Jackson Gillis	December 5, 1953
Superman rams a giant asteroid on a collision course with Earth. The impact causes the asteroid to now orbit the planet, but Superman is staggered as he returns to Earth. He manages to change back to Clark Kent (apparently a reflex action) but doesn't remember who he is. Meanwhile, the orbiting asteroid still presents hazards for Earth. Only Superman can place an explosive device that will demolish the asteroid -- and no one, including Clark, knows where Superman is. Guest Stars: Clark Howat as Assistant, Thomas Moore as Shopkeeper, Jane Frazee as Country Woman, Jonathan Hale as Professor Roberts.
39	13	"The Machine That Could Plot Crimes"	Thomas Carr	Jackson Gillis	December 12, 1953
A scientist develops an advanced computer he dubs "Mr. Kelso". A criminal gains the confidence of the scientist and access to Mr. Kelso. The result: a series of perfectly timed bank robberies. Mr. Kelso is even able to come up with a strategy to defuse the threat from Superman. The computer suggests a bluff: sending a message to the Daily Planet saying Superman's secret identity will be exposed if he attempts to stop the criminals. Guest Stars: Billy Nelson as Larry McCoy, Russell Custer as Policeman, Stan Jarmen as Pinky, Sherry Moreland as Bank Teller, Sterling Holloway as Uncle Oscar, Sam Balter as Radio Announcer, Ben Welden as Nosey.
40	14	"Jungle Devil"	Thomas Carr	Peter Dixon	December 19, 1953
Daily Planet reporters Clark (George Reeves), Lois (Noel Neill), and Jimmy (Jack Larson) head into a treacherous jungle, searching for a scientific expedition which has vanished. The local natives prove quite hostile to the "intruders" because the jeweled eye of a native idol has apparently been stolen. Clark's alter ego, Superman, not only wrestles a gorilla but also uses his bare hands to convert a lump of coal into a diamond. Guest Stars: James Seay as Bill Hurd, Al Kikume as Native Chief, Henry Escalante as Native Man, Leon Lontoc as Witch Doctor, Doris Singleton as Gloria Harper, Damian O'Flynn as Dr. Ralph Harper, Nacho Galindo as Alberto, Bernie Gozier as Native Man, Steve Calvert as the Gorilla (uncredited).
41	15	"My Friend Superman"	Thomas Carr	David Chantler	December 26, 1953
Diner owner Tony (Tito Vuolo) keeps a pair of protection racketeers (Terry Frost, Paul Burke) from bothering him by claiming (falsely) to be close friends with Superman (George Reeves). Tony gets in over his head when he records an incriminating conversation between himself and the crooks, and he is forced to solicit the aid of reporter Clark Kent. The climax of this episode is a slapstick pie fight in which no one is spared a custard massage. Guest Stars: Ruta Lee as Noisy Teenager (as Ruta Kilmonis), Tito Vuolo as Tony, Joseph Vitale as Cap, Terry Frost as Spud, Paul Burke as Ace, Eddie Ryder as Noisy Teenager (as Edward Reider), Yvette Duguay as Elaine (as Yvette Dugay), Ralph Sanford as George.
42	16	"The Clown Who Cried"	George Blair	David Chantler	January 2, 1954
Clark Kent and Lois Lane enlist circus clown Rollo to participate in a telethon sponsored by the Daily Planet. Another clown, Crackers, is present when Rollo agrees. Crackers knocks out Rollo and dresses like Rollo. Crackers intends to rob the telethon and blame the incident on Rollo. Crackers indeed steals proceeds from the telethon but doesn't count on Rollo getting free. Superman will have to make a split decision. When both clowns fall from a building, Superman will have time to catch only one of them. Guest Stars: William (Billy) Wayne as Rollo the Clown, Harry Mendoza as Sung Lu Too, Charles Williams as Tim, George Douglas as Security Guard, Mickey Simpson as Hercules, Peter Brocco as Crackers.
43	17	"The Boy Who Hated Superman"	George Blair	David Chantler	January 9, 1954
Clark Kent temporarily takes in Frankie, a juvenile street tough who has hooked up with Duke, a criminal. Clark, in his civilian identity, is trying to set Frankie on the right path, but Clark will have to do double duty and utilize his Superman identity in order to succeed. Guest Stars: Charles Meredith as Judge Allen, Tyler MacDuff as Frankie, Leonard Penn as Fixer, Roy Barcroft as Duke Dillon, Dick Reeves as Babe.
44	18	"Semi-Private Eye"	George Blair	David Chantler	January 16, 1954
Lois Lane decides to employ private detective Homer Garrity to find out once and for all if Clark Kent is Superman. At the same time, a blackmailer is trying to kill Garrity, whose life is saved by Superman. Both Garrity and Lois are taken prisoner by the blackmailer. Jimmy Olsen decides to pick up the trail of Lois and Garrity while simultaneously trying to live up to the image of a glamorous private eye. Eventually, the lives of Jimmy, Lois, and Garrity are endangered. Clark, in the meantime, picks up the trail. Guest Stars: Richard Benedict as Cappy Leonard, Alfred Linder as Morrie, Douglas Henderson as Noodles, Paul Fix as Fingers (as Peter Fix), Elisha Cook as Homer Garrity.
45	19	"Perry White's Scoop"	George Blair	Roy Hamilton	January 23, 1954
A man in a diving suit begins to walk into the Daily Planet building. He is shot before he can enter the newspaper's offices. Dying, the man says the word, "Quincy", to Perry White. Perry decides he wants to solve the mystery himself after complaining how his reporters rely too much on Superman for help. First, Perry intends to wear an identical diving suit outside the newspaper offices. Clark Kent bends the helmet before Perry can don it. Clark says he'll get it fixed. Instead, it is Superman who wears the suit and is shot at by a gunman. Guest Stars: Jan Arvan as Max, Tom Monroe as Diver, Bibs Borman as Maria, Robert J. Wilke as Bingham (as Robert Wilke), Steve Pendleton as Lynch.
46	20	"Beware the Wrecker"	George Blair	Royal K. Cole	January 30, 1954
A steamship, an airliner and a train have all been destroyed over the past year. Perry White receives a telephone call from someone calling himself the Wrecker. The Wrecker claims responsibility for the incidents and now wants $100,000 or else more targets will be destroyed. Superman prevents another ship from being blown up, intercepting a small model plane carrying a powerful explosive. Clark Kent, Lois Lane and Jimmy Olsen investigate further, checking out the possible source of a mysterious noise that can be heard in the background when the Wrecker calls Perry. Guest Stars: William Forrest as Mr. Crane, Renny McEvoy as Carnival Barker, Tom Powers as Mr. Morgan, Pierre Watkin as Mr. Kilgore, Denver Pyle as Emil Hatch.
47	21	"The Golden Vulture"	Thomas Carr	Jackson Gillis	February 6, 1954
Jimmy Olsen finds a bottle with a written message but seawater has washed away the ink. Clark Kent, using his enhanced vision, can make out the name "Golden Vulture", which is the name of a ship that has docked at Metropolis. The message was written by a member of the crew desperate to flee the vessel. Jimmy and Lois Lane board the ship to do a story but are captured when they find out too much. Clark, meanwhile, using his X-ray vision now knows that jewels and diamonds are being sent to the ship, which has supposedly found treasure in the Caribbean. Guest Stars: Peter Whitney as Captain McBain, William Vincent as Ship Hand, Dan Turner as Ship Hand, Wes Hudman as Dock Worker, Murray Alper as Sanders, Robert Bice as Bennet, Carl Saxe as Ship Hand, Sol Gorss as Ship Hand, Vic Perrin as Scurvy. Note: Sol Gorss was an occasional stunt double for George Reeves in Season 1.
48	22	"Jimmy Olsen, Boy Editor"	Thomas Carr	David Chantler	February 13, 1954
Jimmy Olsen becomes editor of the Daily Planet for a day. It is part of a program where young people assume important offices, including mayor and police chief, for 24 hours. Jimmy, however, wants to be more than a figurehead. He publishes a story in the newspaper claiming the boy editor has important information that will convict Legs Leemy of a robbery. That robbery occurred nearly seven years ago and the statute of limitations is about to run out. Clark Kent and Perry White, both in Clark's office, try to keep track of what Jimmy is doing. Guest Stars: Jack Pepper as Daily Planet custodian, Bob Grosson as Junior Police Chief, Ronald Hargrave as Junior Mayor, Charles Anthony Hughes (credited as Anthony Hughes) as Hospital Director, Dick Rich as Toots, Keith Richards as Henchman, Herb Vigran as Legs Leemy.
49	23	"Lady in Black"	Thomas Carr	Jackson Gillis	February 20, 1954
Jimmy Olsen, staying temporarily at an apartment, is spooked. He is hearing mysterious noises, a painting on his wall seems to have changed and he encounters a man with a scar and a lady in black, including a black veil over her face. Superman investigates and finds nothing wrong, but strange things continue to happen to Jimmy when he's alone. Desperate, he calls Clark Kent at the office. Clark, using his super hearing, realizes Jimmy is in genuine danger. Guest Stars: Frank Ferguson as Mr. Frank, Frank Marlowe as an extra, John Doucette as Scarface, Rudolph Anders as art thief with glasses, Virginia Christine as Mrs. Frank, Mike Ragan as Police Officer.
50	24	"Star of Fate"	Thomas Carr	Roy Hamilton	February 27, 1954
A mysterious box from Egypt causes a bidding war between two men, Whitlock and Barnack. The box also is said to carry a curse and three people, including Lois Lane, are stricken opening it. Superman, in order to solve the mystery and save three lives, will fly to Egypt in search of a plant that is the basis of the antidote. He must race back to Metropolis, or else Jimmy Olsen will become a victim of the ruthless Barnack. Guest Stars: Ted Hecht as Ahmed, Tony De Mario as March, Lawrence Ryle as Dr. Barnack, Jeanne Dean as Alma, Arthur Space as Dr. Wilson, Paul E. Burns as Mr. Whitlock (as Paul Burns).
51	25	"The Whistling Bird"	Thomas Carr	David Chantler	March 6, 1954
Sterling Holloway returns as eccentric scientist Uncle Oscar, who while trying to cook up a formula for flavored stamp glue ends up with a powerful explosive. Rather than write down the entire formula, Uncle Oscar teaches vital segments of the formula to his talking parakeet Schuyler. A pair of foreign spies steal Schuyler and substitute a lookalike, then kidnap Oscar and his niece Nancy (Allene Roberts) in order to steal the explosive. This looks like a job for Superman (George Reeves), but it may also prove to be his undoing, in as much as the loquacious Schuyler is savvy to Superman's "Clark Kent" guise. Guest Stars: Allene Roberts as Nancy, Toni Carroll as Dorothy Manners, Otto Waldis as Scientist, Sterling Holloway as Uncle Oscar, Marshall Reed as Security Agent, Joseph Vitale as Speck.
52	26	"Around the World with Superman"	Thomas Carr	Jackson Gillis	March 13, 1954
A blind girl enters a Daily Planet contest in which the winner will go around the world with Superman, but she has entered the contest using her mother's name. The mother, meantime, wants nothing to do with all of this and is secretive. Clark works to figure out the puzzle and, using his super vision, determines the girl's sight can be restored. Guest Stars: Raymond Greenleaf as Dr. Anderson, James L. Brown as Jim Carson (as James Brown), Max Wagner as Radio Operator, Patrick Aherne as Murray, Judy Anne [sic] Nugent as Ann Carson, Kay Morley as Elaine Carson.

=== Season 3 (1955) ===
No. overall	No. in season	Title	Directed by	Written by	Original release date
53	1	"Through the Time Barrier"	Harry Gerstad	David Chantler	April 23, 1955
A nutty professor uses his time machine to send Clark, Lois, Jimmy, Perry and himself back to 50,000 B.C., along with a notorious gangster who decides he likes prehistoric times. Guest Stars: Ed Hinton as Cave Man, Jim Hyland as Turk Jackson, Florence Lake as Cave Woman, Sterling Holloway as Professor Twiddle.
54	2	"The Talking Clue"	Harry Gerstad	David Chantler	April 30, 1955
Inspector Henderson's son, Ray, has a keen hobby: collecting various sounds on spools of tape. He has a lion's roar, a cannon firing, even the sound of bullets bouncing off Superman's chest. Meanwhile, Henderson is searching for a dangerous criminal known as Muscles McGurk. He is shocked and dismayed to find that Ray may be the gangster's accomplice. It seems that McGurk has been making use of Ray's sound recordings for his own nefarious purposes. After Ray is kidnapped by McGurk, it is up to Clark Kent to interpret a cryptic clue the young man left behind; and then it is up to Superman to rescue him from the gunman's clutches. Guest Stars: Richard Shackleton as Ray Henderson, Julian Upton as Claude James, Billy Nelson as Muscles McGurk, Brick Sullivan as Policeman.
55	3	"The Lucky Cat"	Harry Gerstad	Jackson Gillis	May 7, 1955
Clark Kent and Jimmy Olsen, on duty as reporters, visit a club that is devoted to thumbing its collective nose at any and all superstitions. Members must walk under a ladder after entering the rented meeting house. Pins are left all over the floor, and members are forbidden to pick any up. The chairman calls the meetings to order by breaking a mirror. Their mascot, of course, is a black cat, but bad things begin to befall members. The floor nearly caves in during Kent and Olsen's visit. Later, a member's chemical company catches fire. None of these things are put down to bad luck: they are clearly the work of a saboteur. Suspicion falls on the meeting house's raving, superstitious landlord. It is up to Superman, however, to find the true culprit. Guest Stars: Charles Watts as Bill Green, Ted Stanhope as Mr. Fredricks, Carl Harbord as Charlie King, Harry Tyler as Mr. Botts, John Phillips as Plainclothes Officer.
56	4	"Superman Week"	Harry Gerstad	Peggy Chantler Dick	May 14, 1955
While Metropolis gears up to honor its most popular "citizen" during Superman Week, gangster Si Horten (Herburt Vigran) tries to figure out a way to rid the town of the Man of Steel. Taking reporter Jimmy Olsen (Jack Larson) into his confidence, Horten gives Jimmy a milkshake laced with truth serum, whereupon the boy reveals the location of some hidden Kryptonite, the only substance that can render Superman helpless. Meanwhile, the ever-suspicious Lois Lane (Noel Neill) eagerly anticipates the awkward situation awaiting Clark Kent (George Reeves), who has been assigned to interview Superman on TV. Guest Stars: Buddy Mason as Bank Guard, Herb Vigran as Cy Horton, Jack George as Mr. Vanderglass, Tamar Cooper as Portrait Artist, Paul Burke as Matthew.
57	5	"Great Caesar's Ghost"	Harry Gerstad	Jackson Gillis	May 21, 1955
Everybody knows that the favorite expletive of Daily Planet Editor Perry White is "Great Caesar's Ghost!" With this in mind, he is confronted with the ghost of Julius Caesar. Before long, all of Metropolis is seriously questioning White's sanity, which is precisely the intention of a gang of crooks who hope to discredit Perry's testimony at a criminal trial. Superman (George Reeves) decides to do some ghost-busting to trick the criminals and save Perry's reputation. Guest Stars: Trevor Bardette as Julius Caesar, Olaf Hytten as Jarvis, Jim Hayward as Gangster.
58	6	"Test of a Warrior"	George Blair	Leroy H. Zehren	May 28, 1955
Aging Indian Great Horse is about to undergo the "Donaga", in order to become the new Chief. Superman (George Reeves) lends a helping hand by guiding Great Horse through the grueling gauntlet, a test of strength and courage that will qualify him to become the new Chief. The tribe's Medicine Man, Okatee, however, opposes Great Horse, knowing that Red Hawk, his son, will automatically succeed him. Red Hawk, a college graduate, opposes Okatee's insistence on tribal tradition, which, under Okatee's iron grip, are causing the tribe to suffer unnecessarily. After insuring Great Horse's elevation to Chief, Superman helps to bring desperately-needed rain to the reservation. Guest Stars: George Lewis as John Hancock, Maurice Jara as Red Hawk, Francis McDonald as Great Horse, Ralph Moody as Medicine Man Okatee, Lane Bradford as Indian.
59	7	"Olsen's Millions"	George Blair	David Chantler	June 4, 1955
After rescuing a cat owned by eccentric Mrs. Peabody (Elizabeth Patterson), cub reporter Jimmy Olsen (Jack Larson) is given a reward of one million dollars. Much to the dismay of his friends Clark (George Reeves) and Lois (Noel Neill), Jimmy begins throwing away his money on useless creature comforts, including a butler named Herbert (Leonard Carey), who turns out to be in cahoots with con man Stacy Tracey (Richard Reeves). First attempting to defraud Jimmy, Stracy ends up locking the neophyte millionaire and Lois in a safe, whereupon the pair is forced to incinerate "Olsen's millions" in order to create smoke signals that will summon Superman to their rescue. Guest Stars: Elizabeth Patterson as Mrs. Peabody, Leonard Carey as Herbert, George E. Stone as Big George, Tyler MacDuff as Delivery Boy, Richard Reeves as Stacey Tracey.
60	8	"Clark Kent, Outlaw"	George Blair	Leroy H. Zehren	September 10, 1955
Fired by editor Perry White (John Hamilton), disgraced reporter Clark Kent (George Reeves) joins a gang of diamond thieves. Unbeknownst to fellow reporters Lois (Noel Neill) and Jimmy (Jack Larson), Clark's criminal career is but a sham, a scheme cooked up between Kent and White to trap the real crooks and turn them over to the law. Even so, Clark is forced to prove his loyalty to the gang by "eliminating" Lois and Jimmy, binding the hapless duo to a chair which is then set afire. Guest Stars: John Doucette as Foster, Lyn Thomas as Nurse, George Eldredge as Wingate, Pat O'Moore as Bennet, Sid Tomack as Curtis, Tris Coffin as Stoddard.
61	9	"The Magic Necklace"	George Blair	Jackson Gillis	September 17, 1955
Lois (Noel Neill) writes a story about the discovery of an ancient necklace with alleged magic powers. It is said that whosoever wears the necklace will be protected from all harm. Gangster boss Jake Morrell (Lawrence Ryle) decides to kidnap Lois as part of a scheme to find out if the necklace is all it is cracked up to be, but Morrell has reckoned without the intervention of Lois's fellow reporter Clark Kent (George Reeves), who happens to have an alternate identity as a flying superhero. Guest Stars: Lawrence Ryle as Jake Morrell, Ted Hecht as Correspondent, Cliff Ferre as Dispatcher, Frank Jenks as Lazy, Paul Fierro as Abdul, Leonard Mudie as Professor Jody, John Harmon as Clicker.
62	10	"The Bully of Dry Gulch"	George Blair	David Chantler	September 24, 1955
Visiting the quaint Old West community of Dry Gulch, Jimmy quickly runs afoul of town bully Gunnar Flinch, who has an eye for Lois. Not necessarily a job for Superman, who nonetheless provides a still timely lesson on bullying. Guest Stars: Myron Healey as Gunner Flinch, Eddie Baker as Bartender, Raymond Hatton as Sagebrush, Martin Garralaga as Pedro.
63	11	"Flight to the North"	George Blair	David Chantler	October 1, 1955
Future TV western star Chuck Connors appears in this classic episode as a gangly hillbilly who happens to be named Sylvester J. Superman. Arriving in Metropolis to seek his fortune, the clueless Sylvester answers a classified ad for the "real" Superman (George Reeves) and before long has been hired by a woman named Marge (Marjorie Owens) to deliver a lemon meringue pie to her fiancé, Steve (Richard Garland), stationed at a remote Air Force weather base in Alaska. Meanwhile, gangster Leftover Louie (Ben Welden) has wagered $25,000 that he can convince his schoolmate Marge to bake him a fresh lemon meringue pie, even though she can't stand the sight of him. Inevitably, these two plot strands are intertwined, as a hopelessly confused Steve welcomes the vacuous Sylvester, a gun-toting Louie, and the honest-to-goodness Superman into his tiny snowbound shack. Guest Stars: Chuck Connors as Sylvester J. Superman, Richard Garland as Steve, Marjorie Owens as Margie Holloway, Ralph Sanford as Buckets, George Chandler as Hotel Clerk, Ben Welden as Leftover Louie Lyman.
64	12	"The Seven Souvenirs"	George Blair	Jackson Gillis	October 8, 1955
A curio dealer named Mr. Willy (Phillips Tead) is enjoying a brisk business selling dozens of souvenir daggers that he claims have been bent out of shape by "man of steel" Superman (George Reeves). Of course, Superman's alter ego Clark Kent knows that the daggers are phony. A con man named Jasper (Arthur Space) is hoping to dupe Superman into using his x-ray vision to transform two of the worthless daggers into valuable radium. Guest Stars: Louise Lewis as Lady, Phil Tead as Mr. Willy, Steve Calvert as Louie, Rick Vallin as Scar Man, Arthur Space as Mr. Jasper.
65	13	"King for a Day"	George Blair	Dwight Babcock	October 15, 1955
Cub reporter Jimmy Olsen (Jack Larson) is mistaken for Prince Gregory of Burgonia (Chet Marshall), who has been targeted for assassination. Putting his life on the line, Jimmy agrees to impersonate Gregory, the better to bring the would-be killer out in the open. Once the not-so-well-hidden culprit is revealed, things look bleak for Jimmy. Guest Stars: Chet Marshall as Prince Gregor, Peter Mamakos as Marcel, Jan Arvan as Rigor, Leon Askin as Vallin, Stephen Bekassy as Colonel Gubeck, Carolyn Scott as Baroness, Phil Van Zandt as Maral.

=== Season 4 (1956) ===
No. overall	No. in season	Title	Directed by	Written by	Original release date
66	1	"Joey"	Harry Gerstad	David Chantler	February 18, 1956
The episode opens with a sentimental story about a racing filly named Joey. Formerly owned by a girl named Alice (Janine Perreau) and purchased by the Daily Planet, Joey has the potential to be a winner but refuses to race unless Alice is around. As this story plays itself out, Clark Kent (George Reeves) – otherwise known as Superman – goes after a band of criminals who've been spreading their corruptive influence at the racetrack. Guest Stars: Mauritz Hugo as Luke Palmer, Bill Kennedy as Race Track Announcer, Jay Lawrence as Henchman, Tom London as Peter Thomas, Janine Perreau as Alice, Billy Nelson as Sulley.
67	2	"The Unlucky Number"	Harry Gerstad	David Chantler	February 25, 1956
A contest in which the participants must guess the number of jellybeans in a jar has been rigged by a gang of crooks. Clark Kent (George Reeves), aka Superman, uses his special powers to count the jellybeans and help a needy woman (Elizabeth Patterson) win the contest. Meanwhile, the old lady's grandson Bobby (Henry Blair) is being flimflammed by their room renter Dexter Brown (John Beradino), who tells Bobby that he is Superman when in fact he is part of the gang. Guest Stars: John Beradino as Dexter Brown (as John Berardino), Russell Conklin as Slippery Elm, Henry Blair as Bobby, Jack Littlefield as Boots, Tony De Mario as Vendor, Elizabeth Patterson as Clara Exbrook, Alan Reynolds as Mr. Kelly, Alfred Linder as Collector.
68	3	"The Big Freeze"	Harry Gerstad	David Chantler	March 3, 1956
Dishonest politician Duke Taylor (George E. Stone) and his henchman Little Jack (Richard Reeves) conspire with crooked Dr. Watts (Rolfe Sedan) to rid Metropolis of Superman (George Reeves) just before an important election. Luring the Man of Steel into a locked room, the trio turn the temperature down to 2000 degrees below zero (which in the real world would be more than 1500 degrees below absolute zero). Thus frozen, Superman not only loses his super-strength but also the color in his face and must put on makeup when disguised as Clark Kent. As it turns out, Superman's only hope to return to normal is to expose himself to extreme heat. Guest Stars: George E. Stone as Duke Taylor, Eddie Baker as Guard, John Phillips as Citizen, Rolfe Sedan as Dr. Watts, Richard Reeves as Little Jack.
69	4	"Peril by Sea"	Harry Gerstad	David Chantler	March 10, 1956
Daily Planet editor Perry White (John Hamilton) decides to flex his scientific muscles and develops "Formula U183" which will enable him to extract uranium from sea water. Villainous submarine commander Ace Miller (Claude Akins) decides to steal the formula and eliminate not only White but also the entire "Planet" staff, namely, Clark Kent (George Reeves), Lois Lane (Noel Neill), and Jimmy Olsen (Jack Larson). As Miller prepares to torpedo White's seaside laboratory, the editor's only hope for survival rests with Superman, who of course is also Clark Kent, but Perry doesn't know about it. Guest Stars: Claude Akins as Ace Miller, Ed Penny as Guard, Julian Upton as Barney.
70	5	"Topsy Turvy"	Harry Gerstad	David Chantler	April 21, 1956
Professor Pepperwinkle (Phillips Tead) is an eccentric scientist whose offbeat inventions invariably cause trouble for Clark Kent (George Reeves) and his fellow Daily Planet newshounds. This time, Pepperwinkle has created a device that fools the nervous system and makes people think that they are upside down. Crooked sideshow man Carney (Ben Welden) decides to steal the invention so that he can rob a few banks. Thus it is that Clark Kent disappears and Superman appears in his place, the better to revert "downside up" (or something like that). Guest Stars: Ben Welden as Carney, Mickey Knox as Yo-Yo, Charles Williams as Flag Pole Sitter, Phillips Tead as Professor Pepperwinkle.
71	6	"Jimmy the Kid"	Philip Ford	Leroy H. Zehren	April 28, 1956
Gangsters break into Clark's office, searching for money and important papers, but can't find anything. The boss comes up with a new plan: he has found someone called "Kid Collins" who looks exactly like Jimmy Olsen. He kidnaps the real Jimmy and replaces him with the fake Jimmy, who has orders to get Clark to reveal where the money and documents are. Guest Stars: Damian O'Flynn as J. W. Gridley, Florence Ravenel as Mrs. Cooper, Diana Darrin as Macey, Rick Vallin as Thug, Jack Larson as Kid Collins, Steve Conte as Thug.
72	7	"The Girl Who Hired Superman"	Philip Ford	David Chantler	May 5, 1956
Wealthy and spoiled Mara Van Clever (Gloria Talbott) hires Superman (George Reeves) to entertain at a party. What Mara doesn't know is that she has been manipulated into a criminal scheme cooked up by her guardian, Jonas Rockwell (John Eldredge), who intends to use Superman as an unwitting courier for a set of counterfeit plates. Ultimately, Jonas tips his hand and locks Mara into a safe with reporters Jimmy Olsen (Jack Larson), Lois Lane (Noel Neill), and Clark Kent (Superman in disguise) but is unable to "transform" himself in full view of his fellow prisoners. Guest Stars: John Eldredge as Jonas Rockwell, George Khoury as Casper, Gloria Talbott as Mara Van Cleaver, Lyn Guild as Milly, Maurice Marsac as Orresto.
73	8	"The Wedding of Superman"	Philip Ford	Jackson Gillis	May 12, 1956
While answering some letters for an advice columnist, Lois dozes off. She awakens to a delivery of flowers from Superman, and events quickly lead up to a marriage proposal from the Man of Steel. However, if a gang of crooks, against whom Lois can testify, have their way, the wedding will never take place. Guest Stars: Milton Frome as Farraday, Dolores Fuller as Joan, Doyle Brooks as Poole, Julie Bennett as Mabel, John Cliff as Assistant, Nolan Leary as Justice of the Peace.
74	9	"Dagger Island"	Philip Ford	Robert Leslie Bellem	May 19, 1956
The staff of the Daily Planet serve as referees for a treasure hunt conducted on a remote island by the three heirs to the fortune of Jonathan Skag (Raymond Hatton). It turns out, however, that the "late" Mr. Skag is very much alive and is merely testing the mettle of his potential heirs. Naturally, not all of the participants play fair, and the result of this skullduggery could prove fatal to all concerned. Fortunately, Superman (George Reeves) is on hand to make sure that justice is served and the spirit of fair play is upheld, but this time he has to keep his presence a secret. Guest Stars: Myron Healey as Paul, Ray Montgomery as Jeff, Raymond Hatton as Jonathan Scag, Dean Cromer as Mickey.
75	10	"Blackmail"	Harry Gerstad	David Chantler, Oliver Drake	May 26, 1956
Criminal Arnold Woodman (Herburt Vigran) and his two confederates plant $20,000 in stolen money on Inspector Henderson (Robert Shayne) and then threaten to accuse him of taking a bribe unless he does what they tell him. Playing for time, Henderson agrees to follow orders, which does not sit well with his reporter friend Clark Kent (George Reeves). Nor do things bode well for Kent's alter ego, Superman, who has been targeted for extinction by Woodman through the deployment of a surefire doomsday weapon. Guest Stars: Herb Vigran as Arnold Woodman, Sidney Tomack as Eddie, Selmer Jackson as Commissioner, George Chandler as Bates.
76	11	"The Deadly Rock"	Harry Gerstad	Jackson Gillis	June 2, 1956
Two men have arrived at the Metropolis airport. One is scientist Professor Van Wick, who has brought some rock samples with him from Africa, and the other is Gary Allen, an old acquaintance of Daily Planet reporter Clark Kent. Allen has recovered from being in an airplane crash in Africa some time back. He's felt better than he has in years until a sudden bout of weakness hits him while telephoning Clark at the baggage claim desk. Both Clark and Jimmy Olsen, who was sent to meet Gary, are surprised to see him feel better away from the luggage. Allen, however, feels dizzy and ill once he returns there. Unseen by Jimmy and Gary, Clark is stunned to feel the same symptoms as his friend. This can only mean one thing: there is kryptonite, the only substance that can harm Superman, in the area. The kryptonite is in Metropolis airport and Gary Allen feels the effects of its deadly radiation. Guest Stars: Steven Geray as Professor Van Wyck, Robert Lowery as Gary Allen, Bob Foulk as Big Tom Rufus, Lyn Thomas as The Duchess, Sid Melton as Thug, Jim Hayward as Baggage Man, Vincent G. Perry as Doctor, Ric Roman as Snorkel.
77	12	"The Phantom Ring"	Philip Ford	David Chantler	June 9, 1956
A rash of robberies throughout Metropolis has both the authorities and reporters for the Daily Planet baffled. No one was seen taking the merchandise from various shops and establishments in the city. Editor Perry White is screaming for this mysterious case to be solved. The closest thing to a lead comes to Clark Kent in the form of a homing pigeon. A note is in the box in which the bird was delivered. It is signed by the Spectre, the mastermind behind this crime wave. If Kent wants to learn more about the recent thefts, he's to send a reply with the feathered messenger. No police are to be involved. Nothing is said about Superman and Clark Kent may need his costumed alter ego if he is to make any progress in this investigation. Guest Stars: Peter Brocco as The Spectre, George Brand as Clerk, Paul Burke as Rosey, Ed Hinton as Joe, Henry Rowland as Luke, Lane Bradford as Al.
78	13	"The Jolly Roger"	Philip Ford	David Chantler	June 16, 1956
Island Abel, in the South Seas, is about to be shelled by the United States Navy soon. Daily Planet editor Perry White has assigned reporters Lois Lane, Jimmy Olsen and Clark Kent to cover the event and take before and after photographs for the newspaper's Sunday supplement. The trio goes to the flight from Hawaii to Island Abel. They will have to be gone by 4:00 PM when the bombing starts. Clark, Lois and Jimmy have been captured by a group of men dressed as pirates. If they are the genuine article, Superman will need to work fast if he's to save his friends from naval torpedoes and possible bloodthirsty cut-throats. Guest Stars: Eve Brent as Lady (as Jean Lewis), Eric Snowdon as Capt. Thud, Chet Marshall as Lieutenant, Patrick Aherne as Capt. Scud, Dean Cromer as Riffles, Pierre Watkin as Admiral, Ray Montgomery as Tyler, Myron Healey as Capt. Mud, Leonard Mudie as Capt. Blood, William Henry as Capt. Mud, (uncredited), Charles Cane as Lt. Schultz.

=== Season 5 (1957) ===
No. overall	No. in season	Title	Directed by	Written by	Original release date
79	1	"Peril in Paris"	George Blair	David Chantler	March 8, 1957
Daily Planet reporters Clark Kent and Jimmy Olsen find themselves in Paris, France. They are speaking with French Police Inspector Launay, who is an identical twin of Inspector Henderson of Metropolis. Launay has received a letter for Superman from a neighboring country behind the Iron Curtain. It was written by Anna Constantine, who was a great theater actress before the war. She wishes to meet Superman on the morning of April 2 at 5:00 AM backstage at the La Cordia Theater. According to Ms. Constantine, the welfare of many people depends on the Metropolis Marvel helping her. Guest Stars: Peter Mamakos as Gregor, Charles La Torre as Officer Gerard, Albert Carrier as Inspector Lamont, Lilyan Chauvin as Anna Constantine, Franz Roehn as Jacques du Cray, Robert Shayne as French Police Inspector.
80	2	"Tin Hero"	George Blair	Wilton Schiller	March 15, 1957
While there's still crime on the streets of Metropolis, it's been a slow news week for the Daily Planet. Editor Perry White has ordered Lois Lane, Clark Kent and Jimmy Olsen to go out and search for a story that will sell newspapers. As Kent patrols the city as Superman, Jimmy has found a scoop for the chief. A man is doing a cat's cradle with some string as he crosses the street. He runs into a thief who makes a hasty exit from Federated Savings and Loan. The man stumbles into the gangster, unwittingly capturing him with the twine and his arms. Jimmy takes a photograph of the incident for the Planet. Little does the cub reporter realize that an innocent bystander is about to take part in the greatest adventure of his life. Guest Stars: Paula Houston as Celia Adams, Carl Ritchie as Frank Smullins, Sam Finn as Fingers Danny, Jack Lomas as Big Jack, Frank Richards as Marty.
81	3	"The Town That Wasn't"	Harry Gerstad	Wilton Schiller	March 22, 1957
Jimmy is arrested and jailed in a fake speed trap scam in a fake town, later released. Lois attempts to investigate, but is also arrested and jailed. Foul play is later suspected, so everyone goes to investigate: Clark Kent, Inspector Henderson and Daily Planet editor Perry White. Guest Stars: Charles H. Gray as Fake Arresting Policeman, Michael Garrett as Mr. Harris, Phillip Barnes as Truck Driver, Jack Littlefield as Diner Counterman, Frank Connor as Driver Paying Fine, Richard Elliott as Judge, Terry Frost as Fake Policeman.
82	4	"The Tomb of Zaharan"	George Blair	David Chantler	March 29, 1957
The Secret Cult of Zaharan is an ancient eastern culture, that goes back ten thousand years. Even to this day, survivors of the race believe in its superstitions. Abdul Ben Bay and Alli Zing, rumored members of the mysterious group, arrive in Metropolis in an hour as a final stop on their world tour. For the Daily Planet's anniversary edition, editor Perry White wants Lois Lane, Clark Kent and Jimmy Olsen to get an exclusive interview, something the two men have previously refused from other newspapers and magazines. Believing that it will help her, Perry has given Lois a necklace with a scarab that is an ancient Zaharan relic. Perry borrowed the jewelry from Professor Waters' private collection. Little do he and his reporters realizes that the pendant that is now around Lois' neck is about to put her in the middle of one of the strangest adventures of her career. Guest Stars: Ted Hecht as Abdul ben Bay, George Khoury as Prefecture of Police, Gabriel Mooradian as Airport Robber #2, Jack Reitzen as Ali Zing, Jack Kruschen as Airport Robber #1. Note: This episode states that Lois Lane is 26 years old.
83	5	"The Man Who Made Dreams Come True"	George Blair	David Chantler	April 5, 1957
King Leo of Sartania has come to Metropolis for a visit, and Daily Planet editor Perry White wants reporters Clark Kent, Lois Lane and Jimmy Olsen to get an exclusive interview with him. King Leo believes that his dreams tell of things to come. As a result, his decisions for ruling his country are governed by them. This could come in handy for Rutherford Jones, a confidence man who has called himself the Dreamer. He has placed a classified advertisement claiming to make anyone's greatest desires come true and prevent events in nightmares from occurring. Rutherford Jones could soon cross paths with King Leo, but he may also get an unexpected visit from Superman. Guest Stars: Keith Richards as The Dreamer, Laurie Mitchell as Ruby, Hal Hoover as Mike, Sandra Harrison as Nancy Boyd, Cyril Delevanti as King of Sartania, John Banner as Bronsky.
84	6	"Disappearing Lois"	Harry Gerstad	Peggy Chantler Dick, David Chantler	April 12, 1957
Bank robber Lank Garrett is out on parole after being in prison for seven years. Nobody knows where the million dollars he stole is hidden. Police believe that Garrett will wait patiently for his probation to be up to use the money to finance a new criminal empire. The gangster is not talking to reporters about anything, but Daily Planet editor Perry White is willing to pay an extra month's salary to either Lois Lane, Jimmy Olsen or Clark Kent if one of them can land an exclusive interview with Garrett. Lois and Jimmy have every intention of scooping Clark. Should they get Lank Garrett to talk, the Planet could have one of the biggest articles ever printed. On the other hand, Jimmy and Lois could wind up in the middle of yet another dangerous situation that will require Superman's help. Guest Stars: Yvonne White as Sarah Green, Milton Frome as Garrett, Ben Welden as Lefty.
85	7	"Money to Burn"	Harry Gerstad	David Chantler	April 19, 1957
Daily Planet editor Perry White and reporters Lois Lane, Jimmy Olsen and Clark Kent are working late. Kent is investigating things as Superman when the chief receives an urgent telephone call. The Planet warehouse on 1800 Waterfront Way is on fire. Leaving a note for Clark to take over in his absence, Perry goes with Lois and Jimmy to the location of the blaze. There, Mister White realizes that twelve thousand dollars of the newspaper's payroll money is in the building's safe. Meanwhile, the trio has spotted a lunch wagon with the words "Fireman's Friend" written on the side. The two men running it, Slim and his wisecracking partner Torch, have been giving free coffee and donuts to the firemen to disguise their true intentions. In reality, Torch has entered the inferno after exchanging his tray of food and drink for another one. He is wearing a suit made of fireproof plastic designed by Slim. The pair's motives for their plans are unclear, and only one thing is certain, there's a new unusual mystery that only Superman and his friends can solve. If they don't, a new reign of terror could run rampant in Metropolis. Guest Stars: Dale Van Sickel as Slim's Partner, Mauritz Hugo as Slim, Richard Emory as Fire Marshal.
86	8	"Close Shave"	Harry Gerstad	Steve Post, Benjamin B. Crocker	April 26, 1957
Tony Gambini opened his barber shop in Metropolis last week. As Daily Planet cub reporter Jimmy Olsen is about to sit in Tony's chair for a haircut, notorious gangster Rick Sable cuts in front of him for a shave. Tony realizes that he and Rick grew up together as Jimmy listens and waits. He gets a tip that Sable intends to rob the Acme Jewelry Company at noon. Running to a nearby diner, Jimmy calls Clark Kent in hopes of getting Superman on the case. Kent thinks nothing of what Jimmy heard, but he promises that Superman will be on the alert. Jimmy then returns to Tony's to witness a strange incident. Rick Sable, after being persuaded by Gambini, is calling the police to confess to the crime he is about to commit. Thinking it is all a practical joke, Tony stops him before he can continue. Jimmy later recounts the odd event to Clark. He finds it unusual and cannot help but wonder what brought one of Metropolis' biggest mobsters to do such a thing. There is also the matter of the heist about whether Rick Sable and his henchmen will pull off the job, or Tony Gambini will convince his childhood friend to do the right thing. Guest Stars: Harry Fleer as Lefty, Rick Vallin as Rick Sable, Jack Littlefield as Mickey, John Ferry as Trigger, Don Diamond as Harry (as Donald Diamond), Richard Benedict as Gambini.
87	9	"The Phony Alibi"	George Blair	Peggy Chantler Dick	May 3, 1957
Ed Crowley's gang has just robbed the Wentworth Jewelry Store. Schultzy Garfield pulled off the heist, but the authorities are unable to catch him as he is driving more than one hundred and twenty miles per hour out on Highway 201. Clark Kent received a call about the incident from Inspector Bill Henderson. Acting as an impervious road block, the Man of Steel halts Garfield's getaway car, allowing the police to take him into custody. Another crime has been halted by Superman. Little does the caped hero realize that his encounters with the Crowley Mob are only just beginning. Guest Stars: Phillips Tead as Professor Pepperwinkle, Harry Arnie as Moe, John Cliff as Ed Crowley, Frank Kreig as Benny, William Challee as Clippy.
88	10	"The Prince Albert Coat"	George Blair	Leroy H. Zehren	May 10, 1957
Levee City has suffered severe flooding recently. A clothing drive has been set up in Metropolis to help those in need. Young Bobby Jackson has gotten permission from his great-grandfather to donate items. Bobby has bundled some things together, and two men named Cueball and Mike pick them up. While Mike and Cueball do drop the material off at the various relief organizations, they are using this tragedy to cover the fact that they also steal from the charitable people. In the meantime, Bobby is overjoyed that he was able to do a good deed. Grandpa Jackson is not so happy, for Bobby has given away his Prince Albert coat, which had the old man's life savings of ten thousand dollars in cash hidden in the lining. The funds were for Bobby's education. Mister Jackson placed them in the clothing because he never trusted banks. If Cueball and Mike find the currency, it could be used to finance something evil. Guest Stars: Raymond Hatton as Grandfather Jackson, Claire DuBrey as Mrs. Craig, Steve Wooton as Bobby Jackson, Jack Finch as Tom Summerfield, Ken Christy as Mr. McCoy, Frank Fenton as Mortimer Vanderlip, Dan White as Mike (as Daniel White), Phil Arnold as Cueball.
89	11	"The Stolen Elephant"	Harry Gerstad	David Chantler	May 17, 1957
The Daily Planet is holding their annual picnic for underprivileged children this week. Reporters Clark Kent, Lois Lane and Jimmy Olsen are going to the Haley Circus to make arrangements for entertainment with owner Mister Haley. Suzy, the baby elephant that was to perform, has been stolen. The thieves contact Mister Haley later, telling her not to call the police. Superman himself has even promised that Suzy will do her act for the needy kids of Metropolis. In order for the Metropolis Marvel to keep his word, he will have to work faster than usual to get her back. Otherwise, Suzy could be in grave danger before she can make a young audience smile. Guest Stars: Thomas Jackson as Mr. Haley, Gregory Moffett as Johnny Wilson, Gregg Martell as Butcher, I. Stanford Jolley as Spike (as Stanford Jolley), Eve McVeagh as Johnny's Mom.
90	12	"Mr. Zero"	Harry Gerstad	Peggy Chantler Dick	May 24, 1957
An unidentified rocket ship has been seen flying over the desert. The United States Department of Defense wants Superman to investigate. Daily Planet editor Perry White has been contacted by the government, and, in turn, he has ordered Clark Kent, who has been making paper helicopters, to get in touch with the Man of Steel. Meanwhile, cub reporter Jimmy Olsen cannot believe his eyes. A little man in a space suit has just asked him to take him to his leader. That unusual request is just the beginning of one of the quirkiest adventures that Jimmy, Superman and their friends have ever faced. Mr. Zero, who has the power to freeze people by pointing his finger at them, was duped by a couple of bank robbers. Superman and Jimmy and Lois help Mr Zero catch the bad guys who duped him. Guest Stars: George Barrows as Slouchy Magoo, Herb Vigran as Georgie Gleap, Leon Alton as Clerk, George Spotts as Martian Leader, Billy Curtis as Mr. Zero.
91	13	"Whatever Goes Up"	Harry Gerstad	Wilton Schiller	May 31, 1957
Jimmy Olsen's latest hobby is chemistry. This could prove dangerous for the cub reporter when he accidentally burns Frank Gannis' sixty dollar pair of pants with a concoction that sprayed out the opened window. Fortunately, Superman arrives before Gannis can harm Olsen. Jimmy, blaming himself for the incident, tells Superman to let Gannis go. A rubber ball the lad created, however, proves to be more lethal than any disgruntled pedestrian. It explodes after bouncing, but the Man of Steel's invulnerable body takes the brunt of the impact. At this point, Superman tries to persuade his pal to take a safer pastime like collecting butterflies. Jimmy might do well to listen him, for his meddling with science could get him into deep trouble, after he invents an anti-gravity fluid by mistake. Guest Stars: Tristram Coffin as Major Osborne, Milton Frome as Mr. Gannis.

=== Season 6 (1958) ===
No. overall	No. in season	Title	Directed by	Written by	Original release date
92	1	"The Last Knight"	Thomas Carr	David Chantler	February 3, 1958
Lois Lane and Jimmy Olsen are covering a medieval museum exhibit for the Daily Planet. Lois is admiring a green jewel in a display case as she and Jimmy discuss the possibility of theft and the alarm system. As the cub reporter prepares his camera, he loses a flash bulb. He finds it near a suit of armor along with a specially made cufflink. The pair intend to take it to the lost and found after Jimmy snaps some photos. Little do Lois and Jimmy realize that this unusual trinket could lead them into another very strange adventure. As Lois and Jimmy leave, the suit of armor walks to the jewel's display case. Its iron fist smashes the glass. Lois and Jimmy are detained once the bauble is found with them. Metropolis Police Inspector Bill Henderson interrogates them, and Clark Kent is called. Later an organization of would-be modern-day knights imprisons Jimmy and Lois. Guest Stars: Jason Johnson as Sir Henry, Morgan Windbiel as Policeman #2, Thomas Dillon as Museum Guard, Ron Foster as Policeman #1, Ollie O'Toole as Chauffeur/Squire, Paul Power as Sir Gawaine, Marshall Bradford as Sir Arthur, Pierre Watkin as Sir Lancelot.
93	2	"The Magic Secret"	Philip Ford	Robert Leslie Bellem, Whitney Ellsworth	February 10, 1958
Investment counselor D.W. Griswald is in reality the head of a crime organization. Including tonight's jewel heist, Superman has foiled four of his operations. While the Man of Steel does not know Griswald's identity, he sends him a warning via a walkie talkie carried by one of the thieves under the gang leader's command. The device used by Griswald is burned once Superman's eyes help back his words. Now, D.W. Griswald has every intention of destroying Superman for good. If he succeeds, the city of Metropolis will tremble as a new reign of terror overtakes it. He apparently succeeds, as he manages to trap Superman with a Kryptonite ray gun. Guest Stars: Jack Reynolds as Jewel Thief, Buddy Lewis as Eddie, Freeman Lusk as Mr. Grizwald, Kenneth Alton as Jewel Thief, Budd Buster (billed as George Selk) as Professor Von Bruner.
94	3	"Divide and Conquer"	Philip Ford	Robert Leslie Bellem, Whitney Ellsworth	February 17, 1958
In South America, Daily Planet editor Perry White and reporters Lois Lane and Clark Kent are speaking with President Patillo about placing a Latin American edition of the newspaper in the country. In the meantime, Vice-President Obreon is conspiring with cabinet member Philippe Gonzalez. A briefcase containing a bomb has been placed in Patillo's office. It is to go off at noon. Once the device eliminates the president, Obreon can take his place and rule with an iron fist. Patillo has been doing everything he can to help his people, and this does not sit well with his second-in-command. Obreon, however, did not count on Superman's preventing the vile act of terrorism. Clark, having forced Perry and Lois out of the office, heard the ticking before changing into the costumed hero. The Man of Steel's impervious body took the brunt of the explosion, thereby saving Patillo, but to cover his tracks, Obreon uses the law to assist him. Anyone who is seen at the scene of an assassination attempt must be placed in prison, which includes Superman. President Patillo protests until Obreon points out that if he breaks the law, he will be replaced. Superman has no choice but to turn himself in to the authorities. With the Last Son of Krypton in jail, there may be no way to stop Vice-President Obreon from succeeding in his vile schemes to take over the land. Guest Stars: Robert Tafur as Hernando Obreon, Jack Littlefield as Jail Guard, Jack Reitzen as Felipe Gonzales, Donald Lawton as Presidente Bateo, Everett Glass as Professor Lucerne.
95	4	"The Mysterious Cube"	George Blair	Robert Leslie Bellem, Whitney Ellsworth	February 24, 1958
From espionage to murder, Paul Barton is wanted for various crimes throughout the country. Seven years ago, he disappeared. His brother Steve can declare him legally dead at noon tomorrow. This will prevent the police from arresting him for the deeds in which he is charged. It is believed that Barton has been hiding out in a cube made of an unusual metal created by a scientist who has died. Nothing, even an acetylene torch, has been able to cut through it. Metropolis Police Inspector Bill Henderson is running out of ideas on how to discover if Paul is within the structure. The only thing that has not been tried yet is Superman. The Man of Steel may soon face the ultimate test of his tremendous powers by the Barton brothers and their henchman Jody Malone should he choose to aid the authorities in this strange case. Guest Stars: Bruce Wendell as Paul Barton, John Ayres as Admiral, Joel Riordan as Acetylene Torch Operator, Keith Richards as Steve Barton, Everett Glass as Professor Lucerne, Ben Welden as Jody Malone.
96	5	"The Atomic Captive"	George Blair	Robert Leslie Bellem, Whitney Ellsworth	March 3, 1958
A few weeks ago, naturalized American citizen Doctor Ladislav was exposed to nuclear material, and, as a result of this, he is now dangerously radioactive. Anyone who comes near him will become as lethal as he is. Iron Curtain agents in protective suits named Igor and Nicoli are in the scientist's secluded desert shack, for his expertise in atomic energy is needed by his former country's government. Ladislav refuses to work for them, but the two agents have an ace in the hole. If Ladislav refuses to cooperate, his sisters Anna and Sonya will pay the ultimate price with their lives. Guest Stars: Ben Ari as Dr. Latislav, George Khoury as Nicolai, Elaine Riley as Miss Collins Agent X-29, Mark Sheeler as Igor, Jan Arvan as Zarinski Agent X-249, Walter Reed as General Barrow.
97	6	"The Superman Silver Mine"	George Blair	Peggy Chantler Dick	March 10, 1958
Having struck it rich in his thirty years as a prospector, Harrison Pebble wishes to give to those in need. Both the Daily Planet and Superman are actively involved in the Children's Camp Fund, and Pebble has some land that would be perfect for the charity's use. Money for the site will come from a silver mine that Pebble has named Superman Silver Mine in honor of the Man of Steel. This news could most certainly make the youngsters of Metropolis very happy. Gangster Dan Dobey and his henchman Boris have been in a slump lately, but Lois Lane's article on Harrison Pebble and the Superman Silver Mine in the Planet give them an idea. Dobey is a dead ringer for Pebble. The only differences are Dobey has no mustache, and he has a metal plate in his head from an injury to his skull in an automobile accident. Dan Dobey could pass himself off as Pebble without any problems. Should he be able to do so, the Superman Silver Mine and its wealth could fall into the criminal's greedy hands. Dan Dobey may get more than he bargained for if Superman discovers his evil plot. Guest Stars: Dabbs Greer as Mr. Pebble/Dan Dobey, Charles Maxwell as Boris "Bordelaise".
98	7	"The Big Forget"	Howard Bretherton	Robert Leslie Bellem, Whitney Ellsworth	March 17, 1958
Daily Planet editor Perry White is fit to be tied with reporters Lois Lane and Jimmy Olsen. It seems to the chief that they always need Superman's help when they try to get an exclusive for the newspaper. White has now challenged Jimmy and Lois to get their next scoop without the aid of the Man of Steel. Should they do this, they will get the ten dollar raise promised them two years ago. The only condition to the challenge is that Perry is to go with Lois and Jimmy to see the story as it progresses. Mister White must promise to let Olsen and Lane run things for the article. Perry, Lois and Jimmy may get more than they bargained for if Superman is unable to help them, especially when an eccentric scientist creates an anti-memory vapor, which is used to stage a robbery. Guest Stars: Phillips Tead as Professor Pepperwinkle, Billy Nelson as Knuckles Nelson, Herb Vigran as Mugsy Maples.
99	8	"The Gentle Monster"	Howard Bretherton	David Chantler	March 24, 1958
It is a busy evening in the offices of the Daily Planet. Crime boss Duke has called to threaten Clark Kent. If he doesn't stop his investigations of the gangster's munitions operations, an experimental bomb created by Duke's scientist Harold will hit the Planet Building. The explosive device is composed of a radio directional receiver, a balloon and a bottle of super nitroglycerin, and it could be powerful enough to obliterate most of the city once it goes off in Kent's office. It could even blow up during construction of the weapon. Meanwhile, Mrs. Taylor, who owns and runs a boarding house on 64 Hope Street in Metropolis, has seen an iron monster prowling around next door. Superman may very well have his powerful hands full before this night is over. Meanwhile Duke forces Dr. Pepperwinkle to use his robot to commit crimes. Guest Stars: Ben Welden as Blade, John Vivyan as Duke, Orville Sherman as Gangster Scientist, Wilkie DeMartel as Mr. MacTavish, Phillips Tead as Professor Pepperwinkle.
100	9	"Superman's Wife"	Lew Landers	Robert Leslie Bellem, Whitney Ellsworth	March 31, 1958
Duke Barlow has been apprehended by Superman. He and Whitey Krell were caught robbing the Fifth National Bank. Both men are part of a gang responsible for a major crime wave in Metropolis. The leader of the organization is unknown to everyone, even those pulling the jobs. According to Barlow, who is attached to a lie detector, the leader planning everything is only called Mister X. Even Police Inspector Bill Henderson's best officer Sergeant Helen J. O'Hara is baffled by this case. She's even been trying to get into Mister X's syndicate somehow. This impresses Superman. After Inspector Henderson introduces her to him, the Man of Steel and O'Hara discuss her investigation. Clark then does something that takes everyone by surprise. He asks O'Hara to marry him. The lovely sergeant accepts his proposal. This could prove to be dangerous for O'Hara should Mister X get wind of her nuptials to Superman. Guest Stars: Joi Lansing as Sgt. Helen J. O'Hara, John Bennes as Dugan, Harry Arnie as Blinkie, John Eldredge as Mr. X (the same kind of role he played in "Crime Wave"), Wayne Heffley as Duke Barlow.
101	10	"Three in One"	Lew Landers	Wilton Schiller, Whitney Ellsworth	April 7, 1958
After the money is stolen from his circus a desperate Tex Dawson is in the office of Daily Planet editor Perry White. The Chief and reporters Lois Lane, Clark Kent and Jimmy Olsen are discussing the matter with him. Someone has robbed Dawson. The safe was found completely empty of money, and no fingerprints or clues of any kind have been found by police. If the stolen operational funds are not found within the week, Dawson's circus will be forced to close. This mysterious theft has baffled Metropolis Police Inspector Bill Henderson and his men. This unusual case may even test the uncanny resolve of Superman. Guest Stars: Sid Tomack as Harmon, Rick Vallin as Pallini, Buddy Baer as Atlas, Craig Duncan as Mr. Dawson.
102	11	"The Brainy Burro"	George Reeves	David Chantler	April 14, 1958
Daily Planet reporters Lois Lane, Clark Kent and Jimmy Olsen are in El Pueblo, Mexico. They are in a restaurant meeting a boy named Pepe. The lad has a rather unique pet - a burro named Carmelita who Pepe claims can read minds. The animal's power is tested when Clark is asked to think of how many times he's been in Mexico this year. Carmelita taps the floor thrice with her hoof. Lois thinks that she is mistaken because Clark only went once south of the border, but Superman has been there for rescue efforts. To save his secret identity, Clark says that he traveled in two other moments about which Lois didn't know. In the meantime, Carmelita even guesses Jimmy's age correctly. The burro may very well be telepathic. This could lead to her and Pepe being involved in the most intense adventure of their lives with Superman. Guest Stars: Marc Cavell as Pepe, Sid Cassel as Waiter, Edward LeVeque as Juan Luque, Natividad Vacío as Inspector Tomayo, Ken Mayer as Albert, Mauritz Hugo as Tiger. Note: Natividad Vacío was a long-time personal friend of George Reeves.
103	12	"The Perils of Superman"	George Reeves	Robert Leslie Bellem, Whitney Ellsworth	April 21, 1958
Daily Planet editor Perry White's secretary Ethel has just called the chief. A most unusual person wants to see him. White, exasperated with all the mystery and cub reporter Jimmy Olsen's bumbling, allows the insistent visitor to enter his office. He, Lois Lane and Jimmy are surprised by what they see. The man is wearing a mask made of lead. He is discussing his intentions as Clark Kent enters the room. Since the Planet and Superman were responsible for his incarceration, he and his ten other similarly disguised men will exact their revenge on the Man of Steel by trapping his friends in differently creative ways. His mask is locked on, and only the ringleader has a key. With no way for Superman to identify his enemy, the caped hero will have to discover other means to stop him before Perry, Lois and Jimmy find themselves in grave peril. Guest Stars: Yvonne White as Ethel, Michael Fox as Masked Man #1 ("Boss"), Steve Mitchell as Masked Man #2.
104	13	"All That Glitters"	George Reeves	Robert Leslie Bellem, Whitney Ellsworth	April 28, 1958
Professor J.J. Pepperwinkle is at it again. This time he created a machine that can transform any metal into gold. United States Secretary of the Treasury John Salem and International World Bank President Delbert Carter have done various tests to prove it is the genuine article. They are in Daily Planet editor Perry White's office discussing the matter with him, Pepperwinkle and reporters Lois Lane, Jimmy Olsen and Clark Kent. Carter and Salem know that the professor's invention could topple the world's economy, trade and commerce. The two men ask Pepperwinkle to never make more gold. He promises to not use his new device ever again. Clark, Lois and Jimmy are also sworn to secrecy on the entire matter, but J. Blabbermouth Olsen, as Perry has nicknamed him, has unwittingly spilled the beans. As he, Lois and Professor Pepperwinkle have lunch, Jimmy talks about the gold making apparatus. Gangsters Nick Mitchell and Elbows Logan are sitting in the diner booth behind them, and they have heard the entire conversation. Now, the criminals intend to force Professor Pepperwinkle to make gold for them. Should he refuse, he could pay the ultimate price with his life. Guest Stars: Phillips Tead as Professor Pepperwinkle, Jack Littlefield as Boots, Myrna Fahey as Mr. Golby's Secretary, Paul Cavanagh as Mr. Carter, George Eldredge as Mr. Salem, Dick Elliott as Mr. Golby, Len Hendry as Mitchell.

== Sources ==
- Adventures of Superman at IMDb
- Superman: Serial to Cereal, by Gary H. Grossman, 1976
- Adventures of Superman. Complete series DVD. Warner Bros. Entertainment Inc. 2006, 2007.
