= Frank Delfino =

American actor (1911–1997)

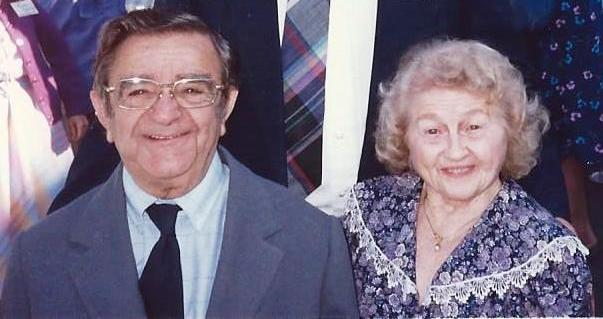
- Frank Delfino and wife Sadie Delfino
- Born: Frank J. Delfino; February 13, 1911; Brooklyn, New York, U.S.
- Died: February 19, 1997 (aged 86); San Diego, California, U.S.
- Occupation: Actor
- Years active: 1933–1992

Frank J. Delfino (February 13, 1911 – February 19, 1997) was an American actor. Delfino had dwarfism, and most of his roles were related to his small stature. He remains best known for portraying the character of the Hamburglar in the McDonald's advertising campaign television commercial's over a 20-year period.

== Early life and career ==
Delfino was born in Brooklyn, New York. Standing 4 feet, 5 inches tall, he became a professional violinist and performed in "Midget Village" at the 1933 Chicago World's Fair. Delfino began his professional acting career appearing as "Johnnie" selling cigarettes for Philip Morris. He subsequently appeared in advertisements for Curtis Candy, Little Caesars, Sprite, and Snickers. He first appeared in commercials for McDonald's, beginning in 1971 and continuing for more than 20 years, portraying The Hamburglar.

In 1949, Delfino moved to Los Angeles to perform in his own local cartoon show, Jupiter Mars from Out of the Stars. He made his feature film debut in 1956 with an uncredited role in The Court Jester. He later had minor parts in films such as Please Don't Eat the Daisies (1960) and Planet of the Apes (1968). He also had more significant roles in productions including At the End of the Rainbow (aka: The Princess and the Magic Frog), The Odd Couple, Little Cigars, White House Madness, The Feather and Father Gang and Never Con a Killer.

Delfino and his wife, Sadie, also worked as stand-ins for well-known Hollywood child actors, including Mike Lookinland and Susan Olsen, who portrayed Bobby and Cindy Brady on The Brady Bunch. In addition to serving as stand-ins, the Delfinos appeared as "Kaplutian" extraterrestrials in one of the episodes of the final season of The Brady Bunch, entitled "Out of This World". One of Frank Delfino's last on-screen roles came in 1988, when he played a minor character in the TV series Circus.

== Death ==
Delfino died of bone marrow cancer at Mercy Hospital in San Diego, California, on February 19, 1997, just six days after his 86th birthday.

== Filmography ==
Year	Title	Role	Notes
1955	The Court Jester	One of Hermine's Midgets	Film debut, Uncredited
1960	Please Don't Eat the Daisies	Minor Role	Uncredited
1963	Papa's Delicate Condition	Midget Clown	Uncredited
1963	Bonanza	Timothy	Episode: Hoss and the Leprechauns
1965	Voyage to the Bottom of the Sea	Boy - Midget	Episode: Time Bomb
1965	At the End of the Rainbow	Leprechaun	
1965	The Wild Wild West	Barker	Episode: The Night of the Glowing Corpse
1966	Movie Star, American Style or; LSD, I Hate You	Midget Photographer	
1966	The Beverly Hillbillies	Spaceman #1	Episode: The Flying Saucer
1968	Planet of the Apes	Child Ape	Uncredited
1969	Justine	Child Prostitute	Uncredited
1969	Hello, Dolly!	Midget	Uncredited
1971	The Red Skelton Hour	Mini Humperdoo	Episode: Humperdoo's Little Prescription
1973	Little Cigars	Monty	
1974	The Brady Bunch	Kaplutian	Episode: Out of This World
1975-1990	McDonaldland	Hamburglar	
1975	White House Madness	Secret Service Man	
1976	Gable and Lombard	Munchkin	Uncredited
1978	The Lord of the Rings	Character Actor	Voice
1979	Americathon	Act	
1980	The Hunter	Poker Player	Final film
