= At the End of the Rainbow =

At the End of the Rainbow also known as The Princess and the Magic Frog
- Directed by: Austin Green
- Written by: Harold Vaughn Taylor
- Produced by: Austin Green
- Starring: David Bailey; Clive Halliday; Dick Reeves; Lindsay Workman; Frank Delfino
- Cinematography: Don Gundrey
- Edited by: Gary Lindsay
- Music by: Billy Allen; Dave Roberts
- Production company: Don Gundrey Productions
- Distributed by: Fantasy Films, Inc. (Original); Shermart Distributing Co. (1970s); Something Weird Video (Current)
- Release date: October 23, 1965
- Running time: 80 minutes
- Country: United States
- Language: English

At the End of the Rainbow (also known as The Princess and the Magic Frog) is a 1965 American children's fantasy adventure film, originally released by Fantasy Films. Written by Harold Vaughn Taylor, and produced and directed by Austin Green, the film stars David Bailey as a boy who finds himself lost in an enchanted forest, encountering an assortment of fanciful characters and navigating a series of fantastical (mis)adventures as he attempts to find his way home. Originally released as a weekend "kiddie matinee" feature, the film was rediscovered and re-released on DVD in 2004 by Something Weird Video, and has subsequently gained something of a cult following for its low budget production values, as well as for the unintentionally camp performances by the adult character actors.

Comedy podcast RiffTrax (Michael J. Nelson, Bill Corbett and Kevin Murphy) recorded and released a riff in 2025.

== Plot ==
The film opens by a lake on Saint Patrick's Day as the story's young hero, an Irish boy named Matthew O'Brien (David Alan Bailey), is playing hooky from school and fishing with his best friend, Timothy Ryan (Ernest Vaio). As the time approaches to return home, the two boys go their separate ways and Matt soon finds a magic frog which he places in his pocket. Deciding to take a short-cut home through the woods, Matt quickly finds himself lost and soon encounters a leprechaun (Frank Delfino) whose beard is caught in a log. Matt, remembering the old Irish legends he's heard from his grandfather, agrees to help the little man on the condition that he give Matt his bag of gold, to which, according to legend, Matt knows the leprechaun cannot refuse. After freeing the little man, Matt soon learns that the seven gold coins in the bag are not ordinary coins, but magic "wishing coins", which only have power when used to do good for others. After warning Matt of the magic of the coins, the leprechaun promptly scampers off and vanishes into the woods, leaving the boy to find his own way out of the forest.

As Matt becomes desperate to find his way home, he unintentionally spends his first coin wishing for some guidance, which, to his surprise, brings a long suffering wooden sign post to life. Now able to talk, the sign post advises Matt to seek the help of a Wizard and points Matt in the direction of the Wizard's cave. As he approaches his destination, Matt finds himself in the Wizard's enchanted forest, where the trees come alive and inform him that the frog in his pocket is really a knight who was put under a spell by the Wicked Wizard. Matt decides to spend his second coin to help the frog, which instantly transforms it into a medieval knight named Sir Humphrey (Clive Halliday). Grateful to Matt for freeing him, Sir Humphrey warns the boy to avoid the Wicked Wizard who had placed him under a spell while he was attempting to rescue a princess named Cecilia. Sir Humphrey decides to accompany the boy as he searches for a way out of the enchanted forest, but their plans are interrupted when the Wicked Wizard (G. Edward Brett) suddenly appears in a cloud of smoke and banishes them to a barren desert.

In the desert, Matt and Sir Humphrey encounter the Genie of Aladdin's Lamp (Dick Reeves) and learn that he has been stripped of his magical powers and has been banished to the desert by the ruler of all Genies. Feeling compassion for the lonely Genie, Matt spends his third coin to restore the Genie's powers, which prompts the Genie to respond in kind, using his regained powers to transport Matt and Sir Humphrey back to the enchanted forest. Once back in the forest, Matt and Sir Humphrey encounter a Gypsy girl named Esmerelda (Nancy DeCarl) who attempts to help Matt find a way home by inviting him to look into her crystal ball, however, the crystal only shows Matt a vision of his worried mother before fading to darkness. Matt and Sir Humphrey continue on their journey and encounter a lonely old puppeteer named Professor Antonio (Lindsay Workman). Learning the Professor has been abandoned in the woods by a traveling carnival after growing too old to operate his puppets properly, Matt spends his fourth coin to bring the puppets to life so that they can perform on their own.

As Matt and Sir Humphrey continue their search, they once again encounter the Wicked Wizard who uses his evil powers to turn Sir Humphrey back into a frog. At the same moment, Matt spends his fifth coin to wish for the Wicked Wizard to lose his magic powers and to become harmless, which instantly transforms the Wizard into a gentle and confused old man. Suddenly realizing the Wizard's final spell has turned Sir Humphrey back into a frog, Matt immediately spends his sixth coin to restore Sir Humphrey to his human form. Now harmless, the Wizard wanders off and Matt and Sir Humphrey once again encounter Esmerelda, who invites the two to once again gaze into her crystal ball which reveals that Esmerelda is in fact the Princess Cecilia who was also under the spell of the Wicked Wizard. Matt uses his last coin to wish for the girl to be freed from the Wizards spell and she is instantly transformed back into the Princess (also played by DeCarl). Having used all seven of his magic coins unselfishly, a beautiful rainbow appears, which guides Matthew to find his way him home.

== Credits ==
=== Cast ===
- David Bailey as Matthew O'Brien
- Clive Halliday as Sir Humphrey
- Richard Reeves as The Genie
- Lindsay Workman as Prof. Antonio
- Frank Delfino as The Leprechaun
- Nancy DeCarl as Esmerelda
- G. Edward Brett as The Wicked Wizard
- Ernest Vaio as Timothy Ryan

=== Crew ===
- Music by Billy Allen and Dave Roberts
- Cinematography - Don Gundrey
- Assistant Director - Gordon Brettelle
- Titles by Paul Satterfield
- Special makeup by Rod Wilson
- Marionnettes by Marta
- Costumes by Elsie Van Riper
- Edited by Gary Lindsay

== Production ==
The screenplay was written by Irish scenarist Harold Vaughn Taylor, who had also written the screenplay for The Magic Christmas Tree the previous year. Veteran actor Austin Green served as both producer and director of the film, which would be the only directing or producing credit of his career. Selected to portray the film's young lead, Matthew O'Brien, was 12-year-old David Alan Bailey who, at the time, was best known for his various guest-starring roles on well-known television series of the time, including Dennis the Menace, The Andy Griffith Show and Bewitched among others. British character actor Clive Halliday was reportedly cast when producer-director Green saw his performance as "Mr. Mousely" in the 1964 Walt Disney Pictures film Mary Poppins, and immediately decided Halliday would be perfect for the role of Sir Humphrey. Suitable filming locations were scouted by Green, who eventually selected Northern California's Carmel-by-the-Sea to serve as the location for the "enchanted forest" sequences. Production then moved south to the desert area near Indio, California, which served as the location for the "impossible desert" sequences.

== Release ==
Originally released as a children's weekend matinee feature, the earliest report of a screening of the film dates to October 23, 1965, when the film was released as At the End of the Rainbow. By March 1966 (and possibly earlier), the film's title had been changed to The Princess and the Magic Frog. As with other "kiddie matinee" offerings of the time, the film did not receive a simultaneous nationwide release and, consequently, continued to play in local movie theaters across the United States until as late as 1971. The film was largely forgotten and thought to be lost, until Something Weird Video released it on DVD in 2004. Upon releasing the film, Something Weird Video advertised their newfound discovery writing, "Yes, boys and girls, here's another mind-boggling children's film, straight from the mid-Sixties, when Americans would dump their youth at the local theater's "Kiddie Matinee" and subject the poor tots to all manner of cinematic torture. Such as The Princess and the Magic Frog, a long-unseen rarity that's so hilariously impoverished, it makes Jimmy, the Boy Wonder look like a multimillion-dollar work of art. [...] There's more that a whiff of Wizard of Oz wafting through The Princess and the Magic Frog, from the child who can't find his way home, to the Wicked Witch, er...Wizard, to the search for the end of the rainbow."

== Reception ==
With the 2004 DVD release, the film began to gain something of a cult "so bad it's good" reputation, for everything from its no-budget sets - to its amateurish costumes and effects - to its unintentionally humorous dialogue and camp performances by the adult character actors. Allmovie and TV Guide both gave the film two out of five stars, while describing the film as "charming" and "enchanting" respectively. In a 2009 review of the film, a local film critic for The Seattle Times wrote, "The Princess and the Magic Frog (1965) was probably made with children as the target audience, but it plays more like something you'd watch at 3 a.m. after a long night of overindulgence." The "kiddie camp" connoisseurs at KiddieMatinee.com described the film writing, "The Princess and the Magic Frog (1965), produced and released originally as At the End of the Rainbow, is a fascinating (albeit threadbare) U.S. fantasy film, very much in the spirit of similar mid-1960s Kiddie Matinee indie product such as Santa Claus Conquers the Martians, The Magic Christmas Tree and Jimmy, the Boy Wonder. [...] (O)ne wonders if 60's tots would have found this odd fairy tale engaging or excruciating. It looks more than anything like a children's theatre production restaged out in the dull woods. Yet even with a fantasy film told with the bare minimum of production value, the question remains; does it work? The answer, in this case, is yes and no."

== See also ==
- List of American films of 1965
