= Little Cigars (film) =

1973 film

- Directed by: Chris Christenberry
- Written by: Louis Garfinkle; Frank Ray Perilli
- Produced by: Albert Band
- Starring: Angel Tompkins; Billy Curtis; Jerry Maren; Frank Delfino; Emory Souza; Felix Silla
- Cinematography: John M. Stephens
- Edited by: Eve Newman
- Music by: Harry Betts
- Distributed by: American International Pictures
- Release date: June 1973
- Running time: 92 minutes
- Country: United States
- Language: English

Little Cigars is a film released in 1973 by American International Pictures and was directed by Chris Christenberry.

The film was also released in the United States as The Little Cigars Mob.

== Plot ==
A gang of dwarves team up with a gangster's mistress, played by Angel Tompkins, to go on a crime spree.

== Cast ==
- Angel Tompkins - Cleo
- Billy Curtis - Slick Bender
- Jerry Maren - Cadillac
- Frank Delfino - Monty
- Felix Silla - Frankie
- Emory Souza - Hugo
- Joe De Santis - Travers
- Jon Cedar - Faust
- Philip Kenneally - Ganz
- Barbara Rhoades - Helen
- Todd Susman - Buzz
- Michael Pataki - Garage Mechanic

== See also ==
- List of American films of 1973
