= Billy Curtis =

American actor (1909–1988)

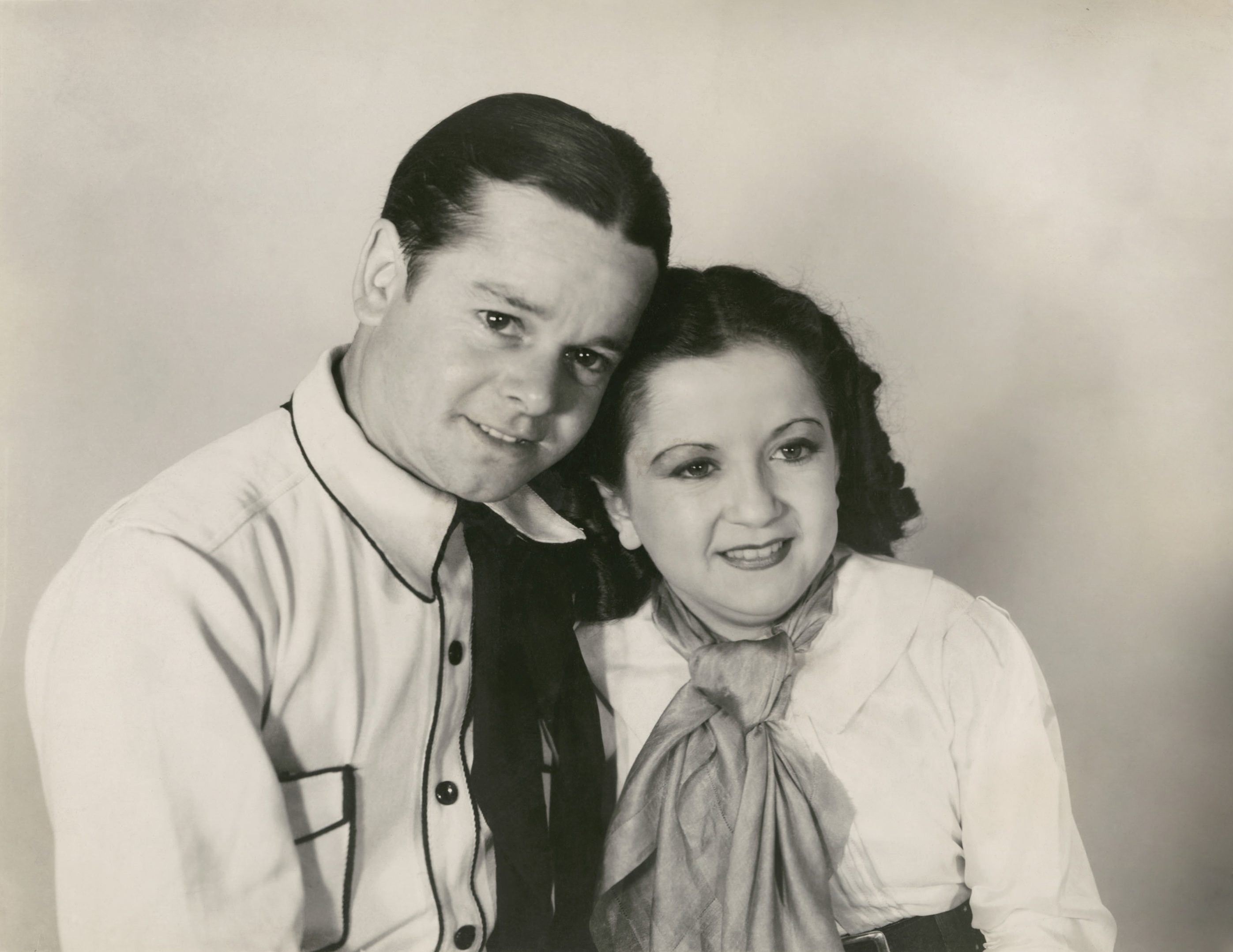
- Curtis and Yvonne Moray in The Terror of Tiny Town (1938)
- Born: Luigi Curto; June 27, 1909; Springfield, Massachusetts, U.S.
- Died: November 9, 1988 (aged 79); Dayton, Nevada, U.S.
- Other names: Little Billy, The Singer Midgets
- Occupation: Actor
- Years active: 1938–1988
- Height: 4 ft 2 in (1.27 m)

Billy Curtis (born Luigi Curto; June 27, 1909 – November 9, 1988) was an American film and television actor with dwarfism, who had a 50-year career in the entertainment industry.

== Early years ==
Curtis was born Luigi Curto in Springfield, Massachusetts, on June 27, 1909. He had three older brothers and a younger sister. After his graduation from high school at age 16, he worked in a store before joining a local stock theater company.

== Career ==
Before Curtis performed in films, he was an acrobat in vaudeville and a professional wrestler. His work in films included being a double for child stars.

The bulk of his work was in the western and science fiction genres, portraying a little person. One of his early roles was uncredited as a Munchkin city father in The Wizard of Oz (1939). He featured as part of the circus troupe in Alfred Hitchcock's Saboteur (1942). He also appeared in Superman and the Mole Men (1951), a B-Picture intended as the pilot for the Adventures of Superman TV series. Curtis followed up this role by playing yet another alien visitor in an episode of the last season of Adventures of Superman television series, titled "Mister Zero". As the title character, he portrayed a stranded refugee from Mars who visits the Metropolis Daily Planet newspaper office.

Curtis's work in westerns included the Clint Eastwood feature High Plains Drifter (1973) in which he was featured as Mordecai, a friendly dwarf sympathetic to Eastwood's character. He also appeared in the Musical/Western The Terror of Tiny Town (1938). As far as is known, the film is the world's only Western with an all-midget cast. Many of the actors in Tiny Town were part of a performing troupe called Singer's Midgets, who also played Munchkins in The Wizard of Oz. In 1973 he appeared as Arizona in an episode of Gunsmoke titled "Arizona Midnight". He had a starring role in American International Pictures' Little Cigars (1973), about a gang of small people on a crime spree.

Curtis also played Mayor McCheese and featured on the cover of the Doors' second album Strange Days.

On Broadway, Curtis portrayed a little boy in Anything Goes (1934) and Every Man for Himself (1940).

== Death ==
Curtis died November 9, 1988, aged 79 in Dayton, Nevada of a heart attack.

== Filmography ==
Year	Title	Role	Notes
1938	The Terror of Tiny Town	The Hero	
1939	Three Texas Steers	Hercules	
1939	The Wizard of Oz	Braggart Munchkin	Uncredited
1941	Maisie Was a Lady	Midget	Uncredited
1941	Emergency Landing	Midget Judge	
1941	Meet John Doe	Midget	Uncredited
1941	Outlaws of Cherokee Trail	Papoose	Uncredited
1941	Hellzapoppin'	Bodyguard	Uncredited
1942	Tramp, Tramp, Tramp	Midget	
1942	Don't Lie	Melinda the Chimp	Short
1942	Saboteur	Midget - Circus Troupe	
1942	My Gal Sal	Midget Driver	Uncredited
1942	Wings for the Eagle	Midget (Eddie)	
1942	Just Off Broadway	Billy, Midget in Wings	Uncredited
1942	Lucky Legs	Newsboy	Uncredited
1943	The Hard Way	Vaudeville Midget	Uncredited
1944	Ghost Catchers	Midget in Nightclub Dinner Gag	Uncredited
1945	That's the Spirit	Midget	Uncredited
1945	Incendiary Blonde	'Baby' Joe	Uncredited
1945	An Angel Comes to Brooklyn	Midget Musician	Uncredited
1946	Three Wise Fools	Dugan	
1947	Buck Privates Come Home	Man	Uncredited
1947	Blaze of Noon	Midget Barker	Uncredited
1948	April Showers	Colonel Rudolph L. Nemo	
1948	Hills of Home	Mighty Mite	Uncredited
1948	Homicide for Three	Himself, Midget	
1948	Jiggs and Maggie in Court	Little Man	Uncredited
1950	Pygmy Island	Makuba	
1951	Two Tickets to Broadway	Midget in Deli	Uncredited
1951	Superman and the Mole Men	Mole-Man	Uncredited
1952	Limelight	Midget in Agent's Office	Uncredited
1953	Here Come the Girls	Clown	Uncredited
1954	Gorilla at Large	Slim, Midget Carnival Employee	Uncredited
1954	Gog	Gog / Magog Operator	Uncredited
1954	Princess of the Nile	Tut	Uncredited
1954	3 Ring Circus	Circus Midget Clown	Uncredited
1955	Jungle Moon Men	Damu	
1955	The Court Jester	One of Hermine's Midgets	Uncredited
1956	Friendly Persuasion	Midget at County Fair	Uncredited
1957	The Incredible Shrinking Man	Midget	
1958	The Adventures of Superpup	Bark Bent / Superpup	
1959	The Angry Red Planet	Martian	Uncredited
1961	Alfred Hitchcock Presents	Carnival Visitor	Season 7 Episode 3: "Maria" (uncredited)
1964	Robin and the 7 Hoods	Newsboy	Uncredited
1965	Two on a Guillotine	Big Mike, Owner / Bartender	Uncredited
1965	John Goldfarb, Please Come Home!	Little Football Player	Uncredited
1965	Harlow	Newsboy	Uncredited
1966	Batman	Midget	Episode: "True or False-Face", "Holy Rat Race"
1966	Out of Sight	The Man From Flush	
1967	Gilligan's Island	Soldier	Episode "Lovey's Secret Admirer", Uncredited
1967	Star Trek: The Original Series	Small Copper-Skinned Ambassador	Episode: "Journey to Babel"
	Bewitched	Goblin	Episode: "Safe and Sane Halloween"
1968	Planet of the Apes	Child Ape	Uncredited
1968	The Legend of Lylah Clare	Clown	Uncredited
1969	The Comic	Lifeguard in Film	Uncredited
1969	Hello, Dolly!	Midget	Uncredited
1970	Norwood	Edmund B. Ratner	
1972	Evil Roy Slade	Toy Cowboy	TV movie, Uncredited
1973	High Plains Drifter	Mordecai	
1973	Little Cigars	Slick Bender	
1973	Gunsmoke	Arizona	Episode:" Arizona Midnight "
1974	How to Seduce a Woman	Toulouse	
1975	The Wild McCullochs	Charlie P.	
1975	White House Madness	Secret Service Man	
1976	Monster Squad	The Ringmaster	Episode:" The Ringmaster "
1978	Loose Shoes	Menchkin	
1982	Eating Raoul	Little Person	
1984	The Night They Saved Christmas	Jack	
1985	Head Office	Reverend Lynch	
1986	The Twilight Zone	Creature	TV series: Personal Demons
1987	Bloody Wednesday	Teddy	Voice, (final film role)
