= The Feather & Father Gang =

American television series

- Title card for The Feather & Father Gang, showing Stefanie Powers as Toni "Feather" Danton and Harold Gould as Harry Danton.
- Genre: Crime drama
- Created by: William Driskill
- Starring: Stefanie Powers; Harold Gould; Frank Delfino; Joan Shawlee; Monte Landis; Lewis Charles
- Composer: George Romanis
- Country of origin: United States
- Original language: English
- No. of seasons: 1
- No. of episodes: 14

Production
- Executive producer: Larry White
- Running time: 60 minutes
- Production companies: Larry White Productions; Columbia Pictures Television

Original release
- Network: ABC
- Release: December 6, 1976 – July 30, 1977

The Feather & Father Gang is a 1976 American crime drama television series starring Stefanie Powers and Harold Gould, which centers on an attorney who enlists her con man father and his team of bunco artists to help her solve crimes. The show aired on ABC from December 6, 1976 until July 30, 1977.

== Cast ==
- Stefanie Powers as Toni "Feather" Danton
- Harold Gould as Harry Danton
- Frank Delfino as Enzo
- Joan Shawlee as Margo
- Monte Landis as Michael
- Lewis Charles as Lou

== Synopsis ==
Toni "Feather" Danton is a beautiful and clever young attorney. Her father, Harry Danton, is a shrewd and skillful confidence man. To keep Harry out of trouble, Feather hires him as an investigator for her law firm. Feather and Harry work together to help their friends and Feather's clients by bringing criminals to justice. Feather uses legal means, while Harry uses his underworld connections and extensive knowledge of scams and stings to help her with her cases. Harry assembles a gang of bunco artists—the "Feather and Father Gang"—who use disguises and elaborate ruses to trick the murderers and swindlers who victimize Feather's friends and clients into incriminating themselves.

== Production ==
Created by William Driskill, The Feather & Father Gang was perceived as an imitation for ABC of CBS's successful crime drama Switch, which aired from 1975 to 1978. Coincidentally, Powers later costarred with one of the stars of Switch, Robert Wagner, in another crime drama, Hart to Hart, which ran for five seasons beginning in 1979.

Larry White was the executive producer of The Feather & Father Gang. Driskill wrote the pilot episode, "Never Con a Killer", a 90-minute made-for-television movie that was broadcast as the series' sixth episode. Other writers who wrote episodes included George Kirgo, Harold Livingston, and Mann Rubin.

Episode directors included Bruce Bilson, Jackie Cooper, Buzz Kulik, Jerry London, Ernest Pintoff, Seymour Robbie, and Barry Shear.

== Broadcast history ==
The Feather & Father Gang's first episode aired on December 6, 1976. After a three-month hiatus, it returned to the ABC lineup on March 7, 1977, as a weekly series beginning with its second episode, airing at 10:00 pm on Mondays until April 4, 1977. It then went into hiatus again, returning to the air on Friday, May 13, 1977, when ABC broadcast its pilot, "Never Con a Killer", filmed to run as a 90-minute made-for-television movie, as its sixth episode. On May 21, 1977, the show returned to 60-minute episodes and settled into a new time slot at 10:00 pm on Saturdays.

Criticized as a derivative and pale imitation of Switch and handicapped by its lack of a consistent broadcast day and time, The Feather & Father Gang garnered disappointing ratings and was cancelled after 14 episodes. Its last original episode aired on July 30, 1977, and the last rerun in prime time was on August 6, 1977.

== Episodes ==
No.	Title	Directed by	Written by	Original release date
1	"Two-Star Killer"	Seymour Robbie	Harold Livingston	December 6, 1976
A two-star general murders a man who tried to blackmail him, and then frames his own aide for the crime. Feather takes on the aide's defense case, and Harry and his gang set up an elaborate trap for the general. William Windom, Alan McRae, Robert Casper, Jerry Hardin, Diane Shalet, and Andrew Rubin guest-star.
2	"The Apology"	Ernest Pintoff	Calvin Clements, Jr.	March 7, 1977
A wealthy shipping magnate with connections to organized crime orders the murder of a friend of the Dantons, and Feather, Harry, and their gang develop an involved ruse to prove his guilt. Gene Barry guest-stars as the shipping magnate. Jeff Donnell, Ray Danton, Bruce Glover, and Joseph Stern also guest-star.
3	"Sun, Sand and Death"	Seymour Robbie	Story by : Michael Winder; Teleplay by : Simon Muntner	March 14, 1977
A crooked land developer murders his partner, buries him on the worthless land they co-own, steals their company's money, and claims his missing partner stole the money and left town. Feather, Harry, and the gang pull a con on the murderer, claiming that the United States Army wants to buy the land for a large sum. Jon Cypher, John Durran, Robert Doyle, John Larch, Frank Maxwell, and Tisha Sterling guest-star.
4	"The People's Choice"	Bruce Bilson	George Kirgo	March 21, 1977
To avoid facing a scandal during his election campaign, a candidate for the United States Senate murders his wife—a friend of Feather's—when she threatens to divorce him. Feather, Harry, and the gang con him into a confession. Sam Groom, Ted Gehring, Robert F. Simon, Joyce Jameson, Elinor Donahue, and Richard Keaton guest-star.
5	"Flight to Mexico"	Unknown	Unknown	April 4, 1977
A stage director murders a young man who overhears his telephone conversation linking him to a recent theft of jewelry and a possible homicide. Feather, Harry, and the gang trick him into confessing. George Maharis, Robert Donner, Russ Marin, Danny Mara, and Robert Lupone guest-star.
6	"Never Con a Killer"	Unknown	Unknown	May 13, 1977
Filmed as the movie pilot for the show and aired as a 90-minute episode partway through the series' run, the episode shows Feather hiring Harry as an investigator for her law firm to keep him out of trouble. To help Feather with her first homicide case, Harry assembles the Feather and Father Gang to clear a hockey player charged with murder. Bettye Ackerman, Jim Backus, Alan Beckwith, Severn Darden, Angus Duncan, John Forsythe, Cliff Norton, Eugene Roche, James Sikking, Marc Singer, Camilla Sparv, and Edward Winter guest-star.
7	"The Golden Fleece"	Jerry London	Robert Dellinger	May 21, 1977
An evangelist murders one of his followers—a college classmate of Feather's—when she threatens to expose him as a fraud and a thief. Feather and Harry believe that her death was no accident, and they work with the gang to create a scam to bring the murderer to justice. Pernell Roberts, Peter Donat, Raymond Singer, and Richard Herd guest-star.
8	"For the Love of Sheila"	Barry Shear	Harold Livingston	May 28, 1977
When an ex-con friend of Harry's becomes the victim of a blackmail scheme concocted by his wife, and then is framed for murder in a convoluted twist, Harry and the gang come up with an even more convoluted scheme to clear him. James Darren, Robert Alda, Brooke Mills, Milton Selzer, and Maggie Wellman guest-star.
9	"Here a Spy, There a Spy"	Barry Shear	Simon Muntner	June 4, 1977
An international spy murders his girlfriend, and frames his co-worker, the woman's former fiancé, for the crime. Feather tries to clear the young man by legal means, while Harry and the gang go about proving his innocence using their own methods. Clive Revill, Michael Shannon, Hamilton Camp, Jimi Williams, and Dennis Cole guest-star.
10	"Murder at F-Stop 11"	Jackie Cooper	Simon Muntner	June 11, 1977
A photographer frames his assistant—a friend of the Dantons—for the murder of his partner to cover the theft of priceless coins. Feather, Harry, and the gang work to clear the accused man. Robert Vaughn, Abby Dalton, William Bassett, Ron Roy, Buddy Lester, and Lawrence Montaigne guest-star.
11	"Welcome Home, Vince"	Unknown	Unknown	June 18, 1977
An ex-convict named Vince is released from prison and immediately becomes the victim of an explosion. The police believe that one of their own is responsible, and they enlist the aid of the Feather and Father Gang to expose the "dirty" cop. Ron Masak, Elaine Joyce, Pat Crowley, Jerry Douglas, and John Karlen guest-star.
12	"The Mayan Connection"	Unknown	Unknown	June 25, 1977
A disagreement between two art importers leads to one killing the other, and the murderer frames one of Feather's clients for the crime. Feather, Harry, and the gang match wits with an organized-crime boss in their efforts to clear her client. Roddy McDowall, James McEachin, Dick O'Neill, John Kerr, Michael V. Gazzo, and Oliver Clark guest-star.
13	"The Judas Bug"	Unknown	Unknown	July 2, 1977
A private investigator fakes the theft of his car and uses it to murder a former client he has double crossed. Feather, Harry, and the gang con the miscreant and bring him to justice. Jack Cassidy, John Pleshette, Hamilton Camp, Pitt Herbert, Tim O'Connor, and Joshua Bryant guest-star.
14	"The Big Frame"	Unknown	Unknown	July 30, 1977
A disgruntled client murders an art dealer and steals a Picasso from him. An innocent man who had had a loud argument with the dead art dealer just before the murder is arrested for the crime and retains Feather as his attorney, and the murderer himself is one of the witnesses against the man. Feather and Harry soon figure out who the real murderer is, and enlist the help of the Feather and Father Gang to prove it. Simon Oakland, Hamilton Camp, Lloyd Bochner, Ian Wolfe, Peter Bromilow, Peter White, and Shirley Mitchell guest-star.
