= Richard Reeves (actor) =

American character actor (1912–1967)

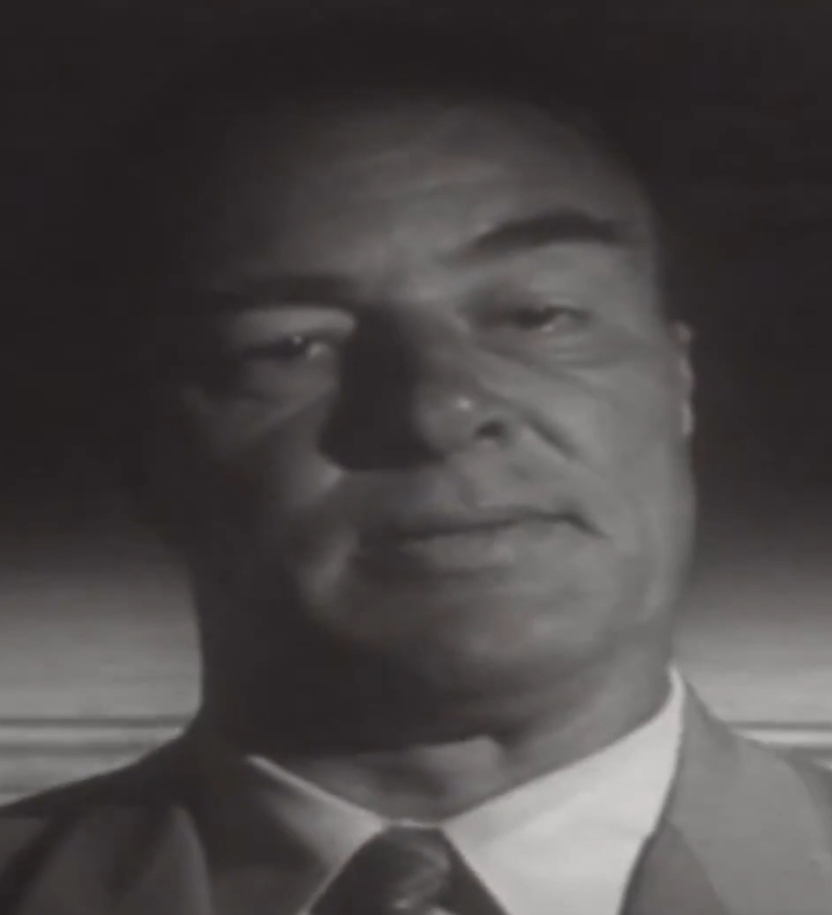
- Reeves in an episode of Lock-Up (1959)
- Born: Richard Jourdan Reeves; August 10, 1912; New York City, U.S.
- Died: March 17, 1967 (aged 54); Northridge, Los Angeles, California
- Resting place: Oakwood Memorial Park, Chatsworth, California
- Occupation: Character actor
- Years active: 1943–1967

Richard Jourdan "Dick" Reeves (August 10, 1912 – March 17, 1967) was an American character actor best known for playing henchmen and thugs. He performed in hundreds of film and television roles between the 1940s and 1960s.

== Early life and film career ==
Richard Jourdan Reeves grew up in an affluent section of Queens, New York, the elder of two children of bank executive Walter Reeves and his wife, the former Marie Titsink. He studied music in school; and then, at the age of 18, he worked as a seaman, spending much of his time in the 1930s aboard ships that plied the New York-Havana route. In April 1942, shortly after the United States entered World War II, Reeves enlisted in the U.S. Army and by war's end had risen to the rank of sergeant in the 1208 Service Command Unit. After the war, he resumed his efforts to get more film work as an actor in Los Angeles, where by the late 1940s and early 1950s he became a busy supporting player in various movie productions.

== Television ==
Beginning in the early 1950s, Reeves began to perform on a variety of television series. His height, heavy build, and general "tough guy" appearance led to his being frequently cast as bullies, robbers, and mob enforcers in modern crime dramas, as well as in many Westerns and sitcoms. He, for example, portrayed those types of characters in five episodes of the Adventures of Superman between 1952 and 1956. (He was no relation to Superman star George Reeves, whose birth surname was Brewer.) Reeves appeared in scores of other series as well in the 1950s and 1960s, such as I Love Lucy, I Married Joan, Mr. Ed, The Roy Rogers Show, Four Star Playhouse, Batman, The Munsters, The Lone Ranger, Gunsmoke, Sugarfoot, Zorro, Maverick, Tales of Wells Fargo, Bat Masterson, Tombstone Territory, TV Reader's Digest, Date with the Angels.

In a 1958 episode entitled "Island In The Swamp" on the TV Western Maverick, Reeves breaks normal villain character, playing alongside Edgar Buchanan as leaders of a peaceful but eccentric cult of pirating immigrant smugglers who now run an island out of jurisdiction of the law. He appeared in S2 E15 of "Wanted:Dead or Alive" as Jenks in "Chain Gang" which aired 12/10/1959.

In 1965 on the television Series, " My Three Sons", Richard Reeves played the "Police Officer" in Season 5, Episode 34- Titled " All the Weddings " My Favorite Martian, Annie Oakley, and Fury. In 1955 Reeves appeared as Cliff Bartow on the TV western Cheyenne in the episode "Border Showdown."

== Death ==
Reeves died of cirrhosis at age 54. He is buried in Oakwood Memorial Park in Chatsworth, California.

== Selected filmography ==
- This Is the Army (1943) - Moore's Son's Dance Partner - 'Ladies of Chorus' (uncredited)
- The Long Night (1947) - Cop (uncredited)
- Unconquered (1947) - Joshua (uncredited)
- The Hunted (1948) - Detective (uncredited)
- Force of Evil (1948) - Policeman (uncredited)
- Double Deal (1950) - Detective Webber (uncredited)
- Dear Brat (1951) - (uncredited)
- Excuse My Dust (1951) - Brigadier General (uncredited)
- Tomorrow Is Another Day (1951) - Joe - Driver (uncredited)
- Force of Arms (1951) - Hospital Attendant (uncredited)
- Come Fill the Cup (1951) - Moving Man (uncredited)
- The Racket (1951) - Leo - Driver / Scanlon Henchman (uncredited)
- The Blue Veil (1951) - Detective (uncredited)
- Finders Keepers (1952) - Joey
- A Girl in Every Port (1952) - Slow Poke, Henchman (uncredited)
- Retreat, Hell! (1952) - MP Outside Division Headquarters in Seoul (uncredited)
- Hoodlum Empire (1952) - Rollins (uncredited)
- Carbine Williams (1952) - Guard in Cage (uncredited)
- Gobs and Gals (1952) - Big Sailor (uncredited)
- The Pride of St. Louis (1952) - Connelly (uncredited)
- Carson City (1952) - Cook (uncredited)
- I Dream of Jeanie (1952) - Tough Saloon Mate (uncredited)
- She's Working Her Way Through College (1952) - Mike (uncredited)
- We're Not Married! (1952) - Brig Guard (uncredited)
- Fargo (1952) - Bartender
- Thunderbirds (1952) - Captain, Quartermaster Corps.
- Stop, You're Killing Me (1952) - Battling Moss (uncredited)
- The Maverick (1952) - Frank Bullitt
- Androcles and the Lion (1952) - Gladiator (uncredited)
- Fair Wind to Java (1953) - Hoppo Two
- The Glass Wall (1953) - Eddie Hinckley
- Ma and Pa Kettle at Waikiki (1953) - Lefty Conway - Kidnapper (uncredited)
- A Perilous Journey (1953) - Stewart the Sailor (uncredited)
- Siren of Bagdad (1953) - Saladin's Guard (uncredited)
- Devil's Canyon (1953) - Guard (uncredited)
- City of Bad Men (1953) - Gunslinger at Ringside (uncredited)
- Man of Conflict (1953) - Thug Driving Car
- Jack Slade (1953) - Rufe Prentice
- Wicked Woman (1953) - Man in Bar (uncredited)
- Money from Home (1953) - Russian Henry (uncredited)
- Trader Tom of the China Seas (1954) - Rebel Chief
- Loophole (1954) - Pete Mazurki / Tanner
- Khyber Patrol (1954) - Khan Servant Bringing Wine (uncredited)
- Target Earth (1954) - Jim Wilson
- Destry (1954) - Mac
- The Silver Chalice (1954) - Overseer (uncredited)
- Day of Triumph (1954) - Gestas
- Tarzan's Hidden Jungle (1955) - Reeves
- Strange Lady in Town (1955) - Mr. Bisbee (uncredited)
- The Eternal Sea (1955) - Rivet Catcher (uncredited)
- City of Shadows (1955) - Angelo Di Bruno
- I Died a Thousand Times (1955) - Deputy (uncredited)
- Top Gun (1955) - Willets (uncredited)
- The Killing (1956) - Bill (uncredited)
- The Man Is Armed (1956) - Rutberg
- Running Target (1956) - Jaynes
- Dance with Me, Henry (1956) - Mushie
- Gunfight at the O.K. Corral (1957) - Pierce's Foreman (uncredited)
- The Buckskin Lady (1957) - Potter
- Auntie Mame (1958) - Mr. Krantz (uncredited)
- Gunsmoke in Tucson (1958) - Notches Pole
- Riot in Juvenile Prison (1959) - Andy, a guard (uncredited)
- The Rookie (1959) - Bruce - Military Police Sergeant
- Twelve Hours to Kill (1960) - Mark
- Blue Hawaii (1961) - Harmonica-Playing Convict (uncredited)
- Toys in the Attic (1963) - Refrigerator Delivery Man (uncredited)
- Fun in Acapulco (1963) - Police Officer (uncredited)
- A House Is Not a Home (1964) - Pete Snyder
- Kiss Me, Stupid (1964) - Waiter at Desert Sands (uncredited)
- Girl Happy (1965) - Officer Wilkins (uncredited)
- Tickle Me (1965) - Jim - Bartender (uncredited)
- At the End of the Rainbow (1965) - Genie
- Harum Scarum (1965) - Scarred Bedouin
- Frankie and Johnny (1966) - Man on Street (uncredited)
- Billy the Kid vs. Dracula (1966) - Pete - Saloonkeeper
- The Adventures of Bullwhip Griffin (1967) - Last Haircut Man (uncredited)
- Eight on the Lam (1967) - Minor Role (uncredited)
- Casino Royale (1967) - Hit Man (uncredited) (final film role)

== Television ==
Year	Title	Role	Notes
1952	Adventures of Superman	Bad Luck Brannigan	S1:E11, "No Holds Barred"
1959	The Life and Legend of Wyatt Earp	Six-Mule Marcey	S5:E17, "Get Shotgun Gibbs"
1960	Rawhide	Sheriff Tom Oldfield	S2:E27, "Incident of the 100 Amulets"
1960	New Comedy Showcase	Eddie	S1:E2, "Johnny Come Lately"
1961	Rawhide	Long	S3:E28, "Incident of the Blackstorms"
1961	Rawhide	Higgins	S4:E9, "The Little Fishes"
1964	Rawhide	Jess Carmody	S6:E20, "Incident of the Swindler"
1964	The Munsters	Gil Craig	S1:E35, "Herman's Happy Valley"
