= The Magic Christmas Tree =

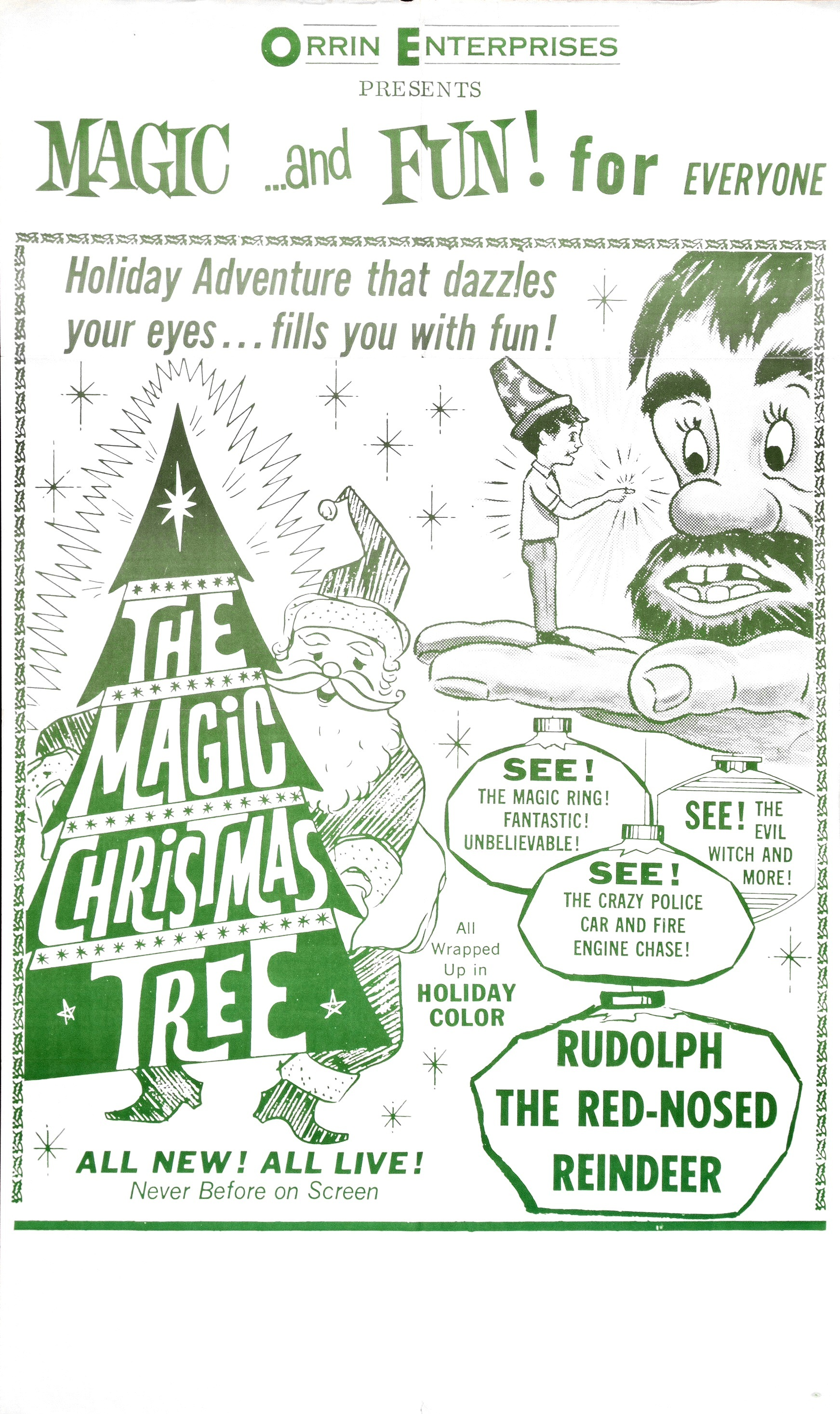
- Theatrical release poster
- Directed by: Richard C. Parish
- Written by: Harold Vaughn Taylor
- Produced by: Fred C. Gerrior
- Starring: Chris Kroesen; Valerie Hobbs; Robert 'Big Buck' Maffei; Darlene Lohnes; Dianne Johnson; Dick Parish; Blanche Mickelson; Willard W. Willingham (as Bill Willingham); Howard Blevins; Billy Schaffner; Terry Bradshaw; Charles Nix
- Cinematography: Richard Kendall
- Music by: Victor Kirk
- Production company: Holiday Pictures
- Distributed by: Orrin Enterprises
- Release date: November 27, 1964
- Running time: 60 minutes
- Country: United States
- Language: English

The Magic Christmas Tree is a 1964 American Christmas-themed fantasy-adventure film about a boy who uses a magic ring to bring a Christmas tree to life. The tree then grants the boy three wishes.

== Plot ==
Three boys are walking home from school on the afternoon of Halloween. On the way home, one boy, Mark, agrees to help a strange old woman to get her cat, Lucifer, out of a tree. Mark climbs the tree, but falls and is knocked unconscious. When Mark wakes up, he discovers that the old woman is really a witch. The witch gives Mark a magic ring, and tells him that if he plants the seeds inside along with the wishbone of a Thanksgiving turkey, a magic tree will grow. When Thanksgiving comes, Mark performs the magic spell that the witch taught him, and a magic evergreen tree grows overnight in the back yard. Mark's father tries to cut down the tree, but to no avail. Later, on Christmas Eve, the Magic Tree comes to life, and grants Mark three wishes. The boy first wishes for one hour of absolute power, which he promptly abuses. Mark's second wish is to have Santa Claus all to himself. When Mark sees the unhappiness his selfishness causes after seeing a giant, however, he uses his third wish to return Santa Claus to the children of the world on Christmas Day. Mark wakes up, and realizes that the entire adventure was all a dream...or was it?

== Production ==
In the style of The Wizard of Oz, The Magic Christmas Tree presents a full-color dream sequence bracketed by black-and-white 'reality' sequences. It was filmed in La Verne, California on an extremely low budget.

== Home video ==
The Magic Christmas Tree was released on VHS by Goodtimes in 1992. It has been marketed in a two-pack with the Mexican film Santa Claus. In 2011, the film was parodied by Mike Nelson, Kevin Murphy and Bill Corbett of RiffTrax.

== See also ==
- List of Christmas films
- Santa Claus in film
