= Superman and the Mole Men =

1951 superhero film directed by Lee Sholem

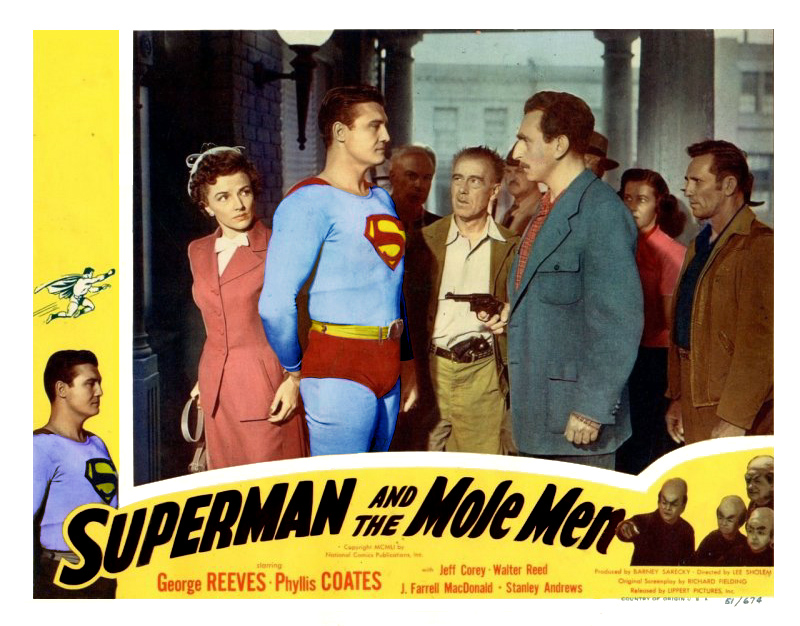
- Theatrical release poster
- Directed by: Lee Sholem
- Written by: Robert Maxwell; Whitney Ellsworth
- Based on: Superman by: Jerry Siegel; Joe Shuster
- Produced by: Barney Sarecky
- Starring: George Reeves; Phyllis Coates; Jeff Corey; J. Farrell MacDonald; Stanley Andrews
- Cinematography: Clark Ramsey
- Edited by: Albrecht Joseph
- Music by: Darrell Calker; Walter Greene
- Distributed by: Lippert Pictures
- Release date: November 1951
- Running time: 58 minutes
- Country: United States
- Language: English

Superman and the Mole Men is a 1951 American superhero film released by Lippert Pictures. Produced by Barney A. Sarecky and directed by Lee Sholem, it stars George Reeves as Superman and Phyllis Coates as Lois Lane. It is the first feature film based on any DC Comics character, and it is the first occurrence of Reeves playing the role of Superman as he later would in the television series Adventures of Superman.

Clark and Lois cover a story on oil drilling in a small town, which inadvertently summons a pair of subterranean, humanoid creatures. Superman defends the creatures against the paranoid and prejudiced townspeople.

== Plot ==
Clark Kent and Lois Lane arrive in the small town of Silsby to report on the world's deepest oil well. That night, two dwarfish, furry humanoids emerge through the shaft and scare the elderly night watchman to death. Lois and Clark arrive at the oil well and find the dead watchman. Clark and the foreman explore the surrounding area for signs of foul play, but then Lois glimpses one of the creatures. The medical examiner is summoned, and he later leaves with Lois. Clark stays behind to confront the foreman, who confesses that the well was closed out of fear they had struck radium and not oil.

The two Mole Men explore the town, but the residents become frightened of them and their luminent touch. Local Luke Benson assembles an angry mob to kill the creatures, one of whom falls from the dam after being shot. Clark resumes his alien alter ego of Superman and rescues the creature mid-fall. While Superman takes it to the hospital, the second creature returns to the wellhead and disappears down its shaft. A doctor announces that the injured creature will die unless it has surgery to remove the bullet. When a frightened nurse refuses to assist, Clark volunteers. Benson's mob arrives at the hospital, demanding to be given the creature. Superman stands guard outside the hospital and single-handedly disarms the mob.

Three more Mole Men emerge from the drill shaft, this time bearing an energy weapon. They find the hospital, where Benson and his mob see them, and Benson pursues them into the hospital alone. The creatures fire their laser-like weapon at Benson, but Superman jumps in front of the ray, saving Benson's life. Superman fetches the wounded creature from the hospital and carries him alongside his companions as they return to the wellhead. After descending to their home, the Mole Men destroy the drill shaft, ensuring that no one can climb or descend it.

== Cast ==
- George Reeves as Kal-El / Clark Kent / Superman
- Phyllis Coates as Lois Lane
- Jeff Corey as Luke Benson
- Walter Reed as Bill Corrigan, Mine Foreman
- J. Farrell MacDonald as Pop Shannon
- Stanley Andrews as The Sheriff
- Ray Walker as John Craig
- Hal K. Dawson as Chuck Weber
- Phil Warren as Deputy Jim
- Frank Reicher as Hospital Superintendent
- Beverly Washburn as Child
- John T. Bambury, Billy Curtis, Jerry Maren and Johnny Roventini as the Mole Men (uncredited)
- Byron Foulger as Jeff Reagan (uncredited)

== Production ==
Superman and the Mole Men is the first theatrical feature film based on any DC Comics character. There had been a series of 17 animated Superman short subjects theatrically released by Paramount Pictures' Fleischer Studios. Two live-action, multiple-chapter serials produced by Columbia Pictures and featuring Kirk Alyn as Superman and Noel Neill as Lois Lane had been shown in weekly installments at cinemas. Two additional serials based on DC Comics' Batman were produced by Columbia Pictures in 1943 and 1949.

The original screenplay was by credited to Richard Fielding, a pseudonym for Robert Maxwell and Whitney Ellsworth.

Superman and the Mole Men was filmed over the course of nearly two weeks, starting on July 10, 1951 at RKO-Pathé Studios. The film, only 58 minutes in length, was released as a trial in anticipation of the syndicated Adventures of Superman television series, for which it became the only two-part episode, titled "The Unknown People". Some elements of the original film were trimmed when converted for television, including some portions of a lengthy chase scene and all references to Mole Men. The original film score by Darrell Calker was also removed, replaced with production-library music also used in the first season of the series.

The laser-like weapon employed by the Mole Men was a prop fashioned by adding metal shoulder braces to one end of an Electrolux vacuum cleaner body. For the ray's gun barrel, a standard metal funnel was attached to the other.

== Release ==
=== Theatrical ===
The film was first released to theaters on November 6, 1951.

=== Home media ===
Superman and the Mole Men was first released on video by Warner Home Video on July 22, 1987, coinciding with the 50th-anniversary celebrations of the Superman character.

Both the two-part television episode and the full feature film are contained on the 2005 first-season DVD release of Adventures of Superman. In 2006, the film was released as a bonus feature on the four-disc special-edition DVD set for Superman: The Movie, and as a bonus feature on a Blu-ray (presented in standard definition) box set in 2011.

== Sources ==
- Warren, Bill. Keep Watching the Skies: American Science Fiction Films of the Fifties, 21st Century Edition. Jefferson, North Carolina: McFarland & Company, 2009 (First Edition 1982). ISBN 0-89950-032-3.
