= White House Madness =

- Directed by: Mark L. Lester
- Starring: Steve Friedman
- Release date: 1975
- Running time: 79 min.
- Country: United States
- Language: English

White House Madness is a 1975 film directed by Mark L. Lester and starring Steve Friedman. The film is a satire of the Watergate scandal.

White House Madness enjoyed a relative upswing in public awareness in 1995 when it was revealed that Phil Gramm, a Republican senator from Texas at that time planning a presidential run, had invested money in the film.

== Cast ==
- Steve Friedman ... Richard M. Nixon
- Dennis Fimple ... Bob Haldeman
- Perry Cook ... John Mitchell
- Rusty Blitz ... John Ehrlichman
- Lesley Woods ... Pat Nixon
- Merrie Lynn Ross ... Julie Nixon
- Margaret Wheeler ... Mamie Eisenhower
- Kathy Bellinger ... Tricia Nixon
- Oaky Miller ... Ronald Ziegler
- Patti Jerome ... Martha Mitchell
- Peggy Stewart ... Rosemary Woods
- Al Lewis ... Judge Cirrhosis (cf. Judge Sirica)
- Del Hinkley ... Billy Graham
- William Tregoe ... General Haig
- George Skaff ... King Feisal

== See also ==
- List of American films of 1975
