= F. W. Williams =

Canadian architect

F. W. Williams was a Canadian architect.

== Work ==
Williams was the architect in charge of the Canadian Building at the 1939 New York World's Fair. The Canadian Building was constructed out of almost entirely Canadian materials. Canadian life and products were depicted in dioramas, animated maps, photo montages, panoramas, and a reflecting pool.
