= Kingdom of the Little People =

Theme park in China

Coordinates: 24.850382°N 102.622261°E

- Interactive map of Kingdom of the Little People
- Location: Heiqiaomu Village, Biji Subdistrict, Xishan District, Kunming, Yunnan, China
- Status: Operating
- Opened: September 2009; 16 years ago
- Owner: Chen Mingjing

The Kingdom of the Little People, formally World Eco Garden of Butterflies and the Dwarf Empire (Chinese: 小矮人帝国), is a theme park in Heiqiaomu Village, Biji Subdistrict, Xishan District, Kunming, Yunnan, China that features comic performances by people with dwarfism. Locals and supporters of the park claim that it provides employment to people who would otherwise be unable to find work, but it has been criticized by western culture for treating dwarfism as a humorous condition.

== Background ==
The park was founded in September 2009 by Chen Mingjing, a person of small stature, as part of a complex he owns near Dian Lake in the western suburbs of Kunming that also includes the World Butterfly Ecological Park (世界蝴蝶生态园). Although many visitors to the park are students from nearby towns, Chen hopes to make the park a destination for tourists visiting China. He provides English lessons for his employees to help them interact with foreign tourists. He aims to eventually employ 1,000 people with dwarfism.

== Employees ==
In May 2009, Chen Mingjing invited people with dwarfism from all over the country to live in the park's "Dwarf Empire" prior to its opening in September 2009. As of 2010, there were over 100 employees whose ages ranged from 19 to 48. The park requires employees to be less than 51 inches (130 cm) tall. The employees live in nearby dormitories which were specifically constructed to be accessible to short people. During the performances, the actors pretend to live in small mushroom shaped houses.

== Performances ==
The performers sing, dance, and perform onstage for visiting tourists. They often act out Qigong, scenes from fairy tales, or ballets such as Swan Lake. They also occasionally perform hip-hop dances. The performances often feature a "Dwarf King." The king, who is only 1 metre (3.3 ft) tall, often wears a gold silk cape and rides a three-wheeled motorcycle during performances.

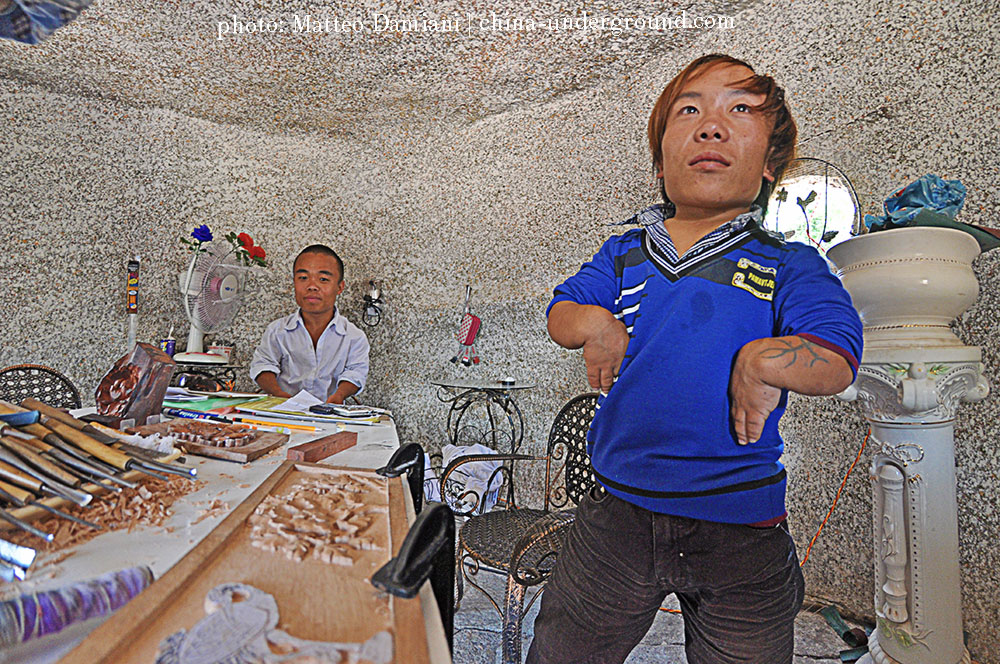
The Kingdom of the Little People (小矮人王国; pinyin: Xiǎo Ǎirén Wángguó), a theme park located near Kunming, Yunnan. Image by Matteo Damiani

== Controversy ==
The park has been criticized by several organizations, including the Little People of America and Humanity & Inclusion. Critics contend that the park resembles a human zoo and isolates its employees from the rest of society. Chen claims that the business provides employment for many who would otherwise be unemployed, allowing them to build self-respect. Many employees have said that they enjoy living with other short people and feel less lonely at the park. They say that before they were employed by Chen they were unable to find work or were exploited by employers. In 2014, Vice filmed a piece for their show, The VICE Guide to Travel, at the Kingdom of the Little People. In their short documentary they interviewed some of the staff and were taken on a tour of the park, including the dorms and behind the scenes places that visitors are not normally privy to.

== See also ==
- Midgetville
- Human zoo
