= Midgetville =

Community of midgets or midget-sized houses, real or imaginary

Midgetville (also known as "tiny towns") refers to real or legendary communities of "midgets", people with forms of dwarfism who are normally proportioned, or collections of small "midget-sized" houses. Real or legendary, they are at times given fanciful qualities (see Little people (mythology)). Some "real" ones may play on mythology for tourism purposes. Hence some descriptions are not meant to imply anything concerning ordinary or real people with dwarfism.

== Fairfax County, Virginia ==
The "Midgetville" in Vienna, Virginia, visible from the W&OD Trail, was a collection of six small cottages that were torn down in 2008. In 1882 the site was a small summertime resort that people visited when they wanted to escape the stressful lifestyle of Washington, D.C. In 1892 the area was purchased by Alexander Wedderburn. In 1901 the hotel burned to the ground, but a normal-sized two-story building was built around the same time at the corner of the property. In 1930, one of Alexander Wedderburn's sons, George, built six small Spanish-style cottages. A courtyard in the middle of the property was sometimes used as a fairground or a farmers' market. The Wedderburns briefly established the Wedderburn Music School on the site. The cottages were rented out but the place eventually became overgrown with ivy and trees. In 2002 the family signed a deal with contractors to tear the place down and develop the property. Though the proposal created some controversy, the Fairfax County Board of Supervisors voted to approve the project. The cottages were all destroyed and the trees were removed in early 2008 to make way for "Wedderburn Estates."

The local legend is bolstered by two coincidences. Nearby Bailey's Crossroads, named for the Bailey family of Barnum & Bailey Circus, was used as a place to winter circus animals in the mid-1800s. Also, nearby Tysons Corner was the home of one of the Barnum & Bailey Circus headquarters. Those two facts are often used to substantiate the legend that Midgetville was a retirement village for circus midgets. The legend is sometimes told with the midgets being xenophobic and throwing rocks at curious visitors to chase them away.

== Jefferson Township, New Jersey ==
Located near Milton, Jefferson Township, New Jersey has been the subject of urban legends about a Midgetville community. The houses are located on a secluded dirt road. There are at least six small houses with small doors, small windows and small furniture inside. Some have very ornate exterior decorations. There is one average-sized house on the grounds, inhabited by an elderly, average height couple.

Rumor has held that Alfred Ringling, famous for the Ringling Brothers Circus, built a few small-sized houses that had four-foot doors. However, the houses currently all appear to be built within the last 40 years and some are built with vinyl siding which was not available during Ringling's time. Visitors claim the "midget" residents are hostile or xenophobic and will therefore shoot guns at outsiders.

== Long Beach, California ==
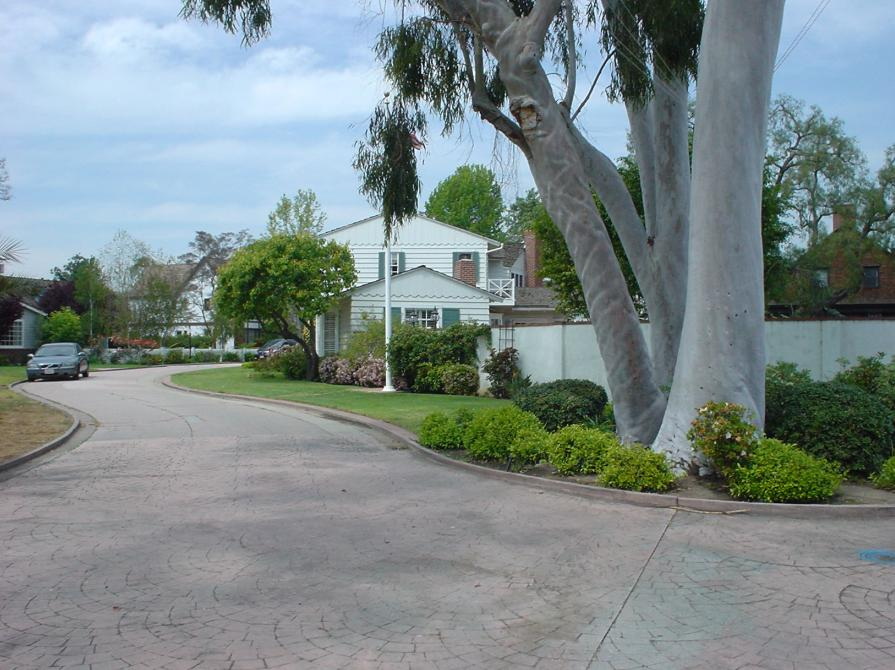
La Linda Drive looking North West from the entrance.

An urban legend holds that with the success of the 1939 American musical fantasy film The Wizard of Oz, many of the little people who had acquired their wealth by playing the roles of the Munchkins purchased lots in the La Linda development of Los Cerritos, Long Beach, California and built homes sized to suit their needs. La Linda affectionately became known as "Midget Town" and the proximity of the La Linda development to the studios allowed them to work many supporting casts in the movies from the 1940s on.

In fact, La Linda, originally the home of George H. Bixby, was subdivided in 1922 and most of the homes were built before 1938.

== Mississauga, Ontario ==
In 1945, the Slovak Canadian Cultural Society established a secluded community cottage site near Streetsville, Ontario at Barbertown, now part of Mississauga, Ontario. The remoteness, small structures, and fencing led some locals to believe it was a Midgetville.

== See also ==
- Haunchyville
- Kingdom of the Little People
