= Good Neighbor Policy and the 1939 World's Fair =

At the 1939 New York World's Fair, the Good Neighbor policy was developed by encouraging cultural exchange between the United States and Latin American countries by cooperation in presenting the event. The policy was the foreign policy of the administration of United States President Franklin D. Roosevelt towards Latin America.

== Background ==
When Franklin D. Roosevelt assumed the presidency on March 4, 1933, his stance on Latin American foreign affairs differed markedly from his predecessors. The growing hostility in Latin America towards past U.S. interventionism provided the impetus for his new policy. In both his inaugural address and his speech to the Governing Board of the Pan American Union in Washington on April 12, 1933, he stressed the importance of being a "good neighbor"—which ultimately became the name for his new policy. In an effort to denounce past U.S. interventionism and to subdue any subsequent fears of Latin Americans, Roosevelt stated that he would "dedicate this Nation to the policy of the good-neighbor—the neighbor who resolutely respects himself and, because he does so, respects the rights of others—the neighbor who respects his obligations and respects the sanctity of his agreements in and with a world of neighbors." This shift in U.S.-Latin American relations ushered in the era of the Good Neighbor and attempts to reverse the preconceived notions Americans had of their neighbors to the south.

Chile orienting readers by comparing the size of Chile to the U.S.

Prior to the Good Neighbor era, the United States maintained a dominating presence in Latin America—otherwise known as the Big Stick Policy. The United States not only wanted to establish itself within the region, but it also wanted to impose its cultural superiority, thus threatening the very way of life throughout Latin American countries. But with the advent of the Good Neighbor policy, the United States opted against interventionism and strove to promote positive hemispheric relations—one that did not pry into the daily lives of Latin Americans. This shift in hemispheric relations demonstrates the concerted effort on behalf of the United States to maintain positive relations with their neighbors. Ultimately, the policy sought to redefine the perceptions and relations between the US and Latin America with the main intent to shed negative stereotypes—that were prevalent during US interventionism—and to encourage beneficial relations.

== Cultural impact ==
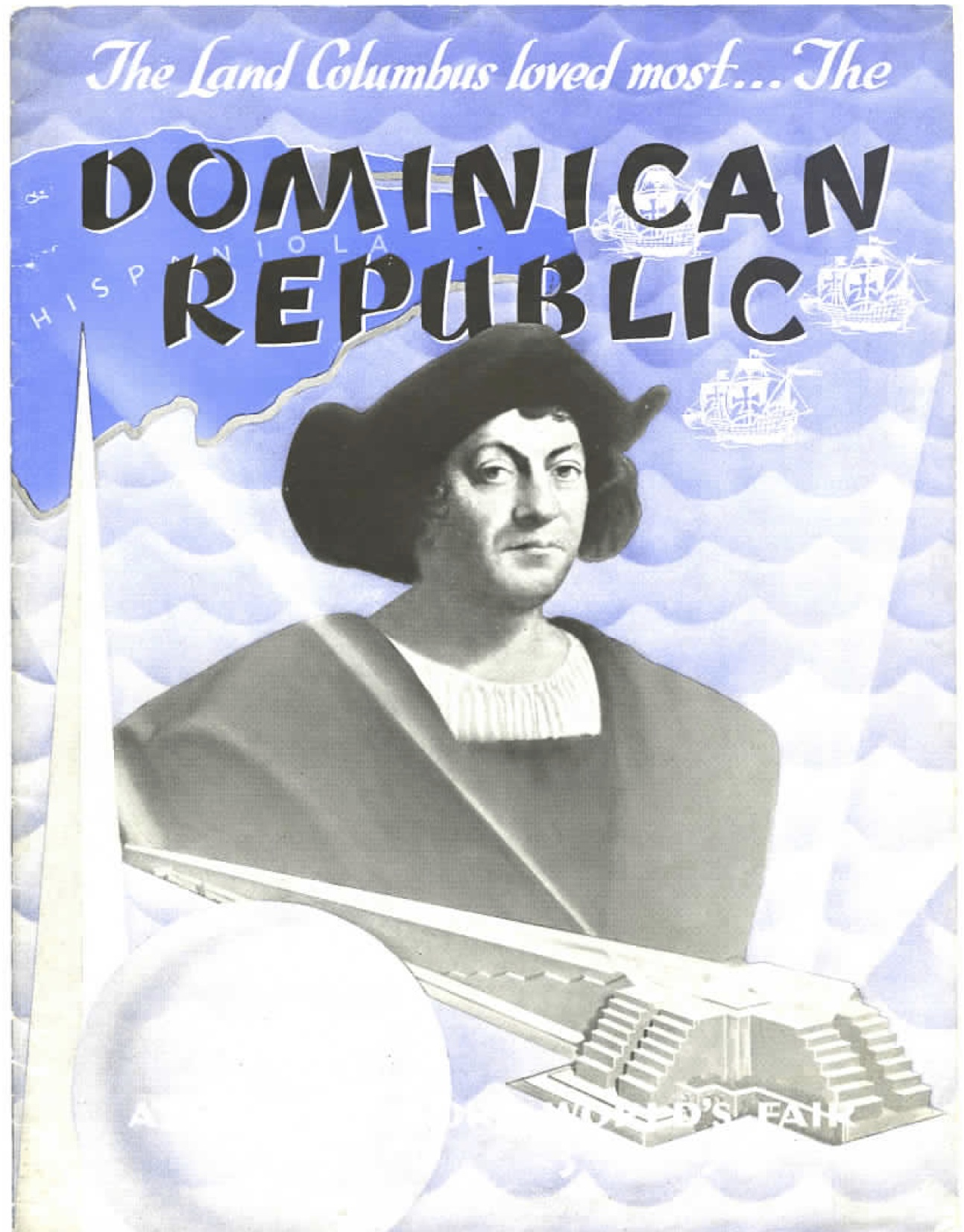
Christopher Columbus on the cover of the Dominican Republic pamphlet

The New York World's Fair of 1939 was just the place to promote neighborly relations between the U.S. and Latin America. Placed against the backdrop of a growing Nazi threat, the World's Fair was an attempt to escape from the looming prospect of war and to promote peace and interdependence between nations. With the fair boasting over 60 countries, with some coming from Latin America, this was the place to redefine negative Latin American stereotypes. Argentina, Brazil, Chile, Venezuela, Cuba, Mexico, Peru, Nicaragua, and the Pan American Union were all represented at the World's Fair. Each country seized the opportunity to showcase their country and to make it more appealing to those around the world, especially in the United States. In their bid to increase cultural awareness at the World's Fair, the countries promoted tourism and strove to compare itself to the United States in an effort to appeal to Americans. Various pamphlets placed their respective country alongside the United States in order to orient Americans to the geography of Latin America—as depicted in the Chilean pamphlet from the World's Fair.

== Tourism ==
Pamphlets further discussed the tourist paradise each of the countries had to offer by ultimately comparing itself to the United States. When the Dominican Republic promoted tourism it tried to appeal to a broader audience by describing its government as a "democratic representative regime, like that of the United States." However, during this time, the Dominican Republic was under the control of Rafael Trujillo, who was the President from 1930–1938, and again from 1942–1952. Despite the term President, he remained a dictator and even during the inter-presidency years, he remained the de facto leader under the auspices of the Dominican military. Hence, the Dominican Republic's characterization of its government as being democratic during the World's Fair provides a unique entre into the different ways in which countries attempted to promote tourism. Further, the Dominican Republic played to American sentiments by showing the "Avenue of George Washington," a prominent street in the Dominican Republic that was renamed after Trujillo came to power. More importantly, however, it tried to appeal to Americans by saying it was the "land Christopher Columbus loved most." The pamphlet also boasted high praise from American diplomats. Senator of Rhode Island, Theodore Francis Green wished more people would visit the island and exclaimed how he would soon return to the "beautiful island." By trying to associate and compare itself to the United States, Latin American countries did not only raise cultural awareness but also showed Americans how visiting Latin America could be a positive experience for them.
